Elvis Aaron Presley (January 8, 1935 – August 16, 1977), often referred to mononymously as Elvis, was an American singer, actor and sergeant in the United States Army. Dubbed the "King of Rock and Roll", he is regarded as one of the most significant cultural figures of the 20th century. His energized interpretations of songs and sexually provocative performance style, combined with a singularly potent mix of influences across color lines during a transformative era in race relations, led him to both great success and initial controversy.

Presley was born in Tupelo, Mississippi, and relocated to Memphis, Tennessee, with his family when he was 13 years old. His music career began there in 1954, recording at Sun Records with producer Sam Phillips, who wanted to bring the sound of African-American music to a wider audience. Presley, on rhythm acoustic guitar, and accompanied by lead guitarist Scotty Moore and bassist Bill Black, was a pioneer of rockabilly, an uptempo, backbeat-driven fusion of country music and rhythm and blues. In 1955, drummer D. J. Fontana joined to complete the lineup of Presley's classic quartet and RCA Victor acquired his contract in a deal arranged by Colonel Tom Parker, who would manage him for more than two decades. Presley's first RCA Victor single, "Heartbreak Hotel", was released in January 1956 and became a number-one hit in the United States. Within a year, RCA would sell ten million Presley singles. With a series of successful network television appearances and chart-topping records, Presley became the leading figure of the newly popular sound of rock and roll; though his performative style and promotion of the then-marginalized sound of African Americans led to him being widely considered a threat to the moral well-being of the White American youth.

In November 1956, Presley made his film debut in Love Me Tender. Drafted into military service in 1958, Presley relaunched his recording career two years later with some of his most commercially successful work. He held few concerts, however, and guided by Parker, proceeded to devote much of the 1960s to making Hollywood films and soundtrack albums, most of them critically derided. Some of his most famous films included Jailhouse Rock (1957), Blue Hawaii (1961), and Viva Las Vegas (1964). In 1968, following a seven-year break from live performances, he returned to the stage in the acclaimed television comeback special Elvis, which led to an extended Las Vegas concert residency and a string of highly profitable tours. In 1973, Presley gave the first concert by a solo artist to be broadcast around the world, Aloha from Hawaii. Years of prescription drug abuse and unhealthy eating habits severely compromised his health, and he died suddenly in 1977 at his Graceland estate at the age of 42.

Having sold about 500 million records worldwide, Presley is one of the best-selling music artists of all time. He was commercially successful in many genres, including pop, country, rhythm & blues, adult contemporary, and gospel. Presley won three Grammy Awards, received the Grammy Lifetime Achievement Award at age 36, and has been inducted into multiple music halls of fame. He holds several records, including the most RIAA-certified gold and platinum albums, the most albums charted on the Billboard 200, the most number-one albums by a solo artist on the UK Albums Chart, and the most number-one singles by any act on the UK Singles Chart. In 2018, Presley was posthumously awarded the Presidential Medal of Freedom.

Life and career

1935–1953: Early years

Childhood in Tupelo 

Elvis Aaron Presley was born on January 8, 1935, in Tupelo, Mississippi, to Vernon Elvis and Gladys Love (née Smith) Presley in a two-room shotgun house that his father built for the occasion. Elvis's identical twin brother, Jesse Garon Presley, was delivered 35 minutes before him, stillborn. Presley became close to both parents and formed an especially close bond with his mother. The family attended an Assembly of God church, where he found his initial musical inspiration.

Presley's father Vernon was of German, Scottish, and English origins. Vernon was a descendant of the Harrison family of Virginia, through his mother Minnie Mae Presley, née Hood. Presley's mother Gladys was Scots-Irish with some French Norman ancestry. His mother and the rest of the family believed that her great-great-grandmother, Morning Dove White, was Cherokee. This belief was restated by Elvis's granddaughter Riley Keough in 2017. Elaine Dundy, in her biography, supports the belief.

Vernon moved from one odd job to the next, showing little ambition. The family often relied on help from neighbors and government food assistance. In 1938, they lost their home after Vernon was found guilty of altering a check written by his landowner and sometime-employer. He was jailed for eight months, while Gladys and Elvis moved in with relatives.

In September 1941, Presley entered first grade at East Tupelo Consolidated, where his teachers regarded him as "average". He was encouraged to enter a singing contest after impressing his schoolteacher with a rendition of Red Foley's country song "Old Shep" during morning prayers. The contest, held at the Mississippi–Alabama Fair and Dairy Show on October 3, 1945, was his first public performance. The ten-year-old Presley stood on a chair to reach the microphone and sang "Old Shep". He recalled placing fifth. A few months later, Presley received his first guitar for his birthday; he had hoped for something else—by different accounts, either a bicycle or a rifle. Over the following year, he received basic guitar lessons from two of his uncles and the new pastor at the family's church. Presley recalled, "I took the guitar, and I watched people, and I learned to play a little bit. But I would never sing in public. I was very shy about it."

In September 1946, Presley entered a new school, Milam, for sixth grade; he was regarded as a loner. The following year, he began bringing his guitar to school on a daily basis. He played and sang during lunchtime and was often teased as a "trashy" kid who played hillbilly music. By then, the family was living in a largely black neighborhood. Presley was a devotee of Mississippi Slim's show on the Tupelo radio station WELO. He was described as "crazy about music" by Slim's younger brother, who was one of Presley's classmates and often took him into the station. Slim supplemented Presley's guitar instruction by demonstrating chord techniques. When his protégé was 12 years old, Slim scheduled him for two on-air performances. Presley was overcome by stage fright the first time, but succeeded in performing the following week.

Teenage life in Memphis 
In November 1948, the family moved to Memphis, Tennessee. After residing for nearly a year in rooming houses, they were granted a two-bedroom apartment in the public housing complex known as the Lauderdale Courts. Enrolled at L. C. Humes High School, Presley received only a C in music in eighth grade. When his music teacher told him that he had no aptitude for singing, he brought in his guitar the next day and sang a recent hit, "Keep Them Cold Icy Fingers Off Me", to prove otherwise. A classmate later recalled that the teacher "agreed that Elvis was right when he said that she didn't appreciate his kind of singing". He was usually too shy to perform openly and was occasionally bullied by classmates who viewed him as a "mama's boy".

In 1950, he began practicing guitar regularly under the tutelage of Lee Denson, a neighbor two and a half years his senior. They and three other boys—including two future rockabilly pioneers, brothers Dorsey and Johnny Burnette—formed a loose musical collective that played frequently around the Courts. That September, he began working as an usher at Loew's State Theater. Other jobs followed at Precision Tool, Loew's again, and MARL Metal Products. Presley also helped Jewish neighbors, the Fruchters, by being their shabbos goy.

During his junior year, Presley began to stand out more among his classmates, largely because of his appearance: he grew his sideburns and styled his hair with rose oil and Vaseline. In his free time, he would head down to Beale Street, the heart of Memphis's thriving blues scene, and gaze longingly at the wild, flashy clothes in the windows of Lansky Brothers. By his senior year, he was wearing those clothes. Overcoming his reticence about performing outside the Lauderdale Courts, he competed in Humes' Annual "Minstrel" show in April 1953. Singing and playing guitar, he opened with "Till I Waltz Again with You", a recent hit for Teresa Brewer. Presley recalled that the performance did much for his reputation: "I wasn't popular in school ... I failed music—only thing I ever failed. And then they entered me in this talent show ... when I came onstage I heard people kind of rumbling and whispering and so forth, 'cause nobody knew I even sang. It was amazing how popular I became in school after that."

Presley, who received no formal music training and could not read music, studied and played by ear. He also frequented record stores that provided jukeboxes and listening booths to customers. He knew all of Hank Snow's songs, and he loved records by other country singers such as Roy Acuff, Ernest Tubb, Ted Daffan, Jimmie Rodgers, Jimmie Davis, and Bob Wills. The Southern gospel singer Jake Hess, one of his favorite performers, was a significant influence on his ballad-singing style. He was a regular audience member at the monthly All-Night Singings downtown, where many of the white gospel groups that performed reflected the influence of African-American spiritual music. He adored the music of black gospel singer Sister Rosetta Tharpe.

Presley listened to regional radio stations, such as WDIA-AM, that played "race records": spirituals, blues, and the modern, backbeat-heavy sound of rhythm and blues. Like some of his peers, he may have attended blues venues only on nights designated for exclusively white audiences — a necessity in the segregated South. Many of his future recordings were inspired by local African-American musicians such as Arthur Crudup and Rufus Thomas. B.B. King recalled that he had known Presley before he was popular when they both used to frequent Beale Street. By the time he graduated from high school in June 1953, Presley had already singled out music as his future.

1953–1956: First recordings

Sam Phillips and Sun Records 

In August 1953, Presley checked into the offices of Memphis Recording Service, the company run by Sam Phillips before he started Sun Records. He aimed to pay for a few minutes of studio time to record a two-sided acetate disc: "My Happiness" and "That's When Your Heartaches Begin". He later claimed that he intended the record as a birthday gift for his mother, or that he was merely interested in what he "sounded like", although there was a much cheaper, amateur record-making service at a nearby general store. Biographer Peter Guralnick argued that he chose Sun in the hope of being discovered. Asked by receptionist Marion Keisker what kind of singer he was, Presley responded, "I sing all kinds." When she pressed him on who he sounded like, he repeatedly answered, "I don't sound like nobody." After he recorded, Sun boss Sam Phillips asked Keisker to note down the young man's name, which she did along with her own commentary: "Good ballad singer. Hold."

In January 1954, Presley cut a second acetate at Sun Records—"I'll Never Stand in Your Way" and "It Wouldn't Be the Same Without You"—but again nothing came of it. Not long after, he failed an audition for a local vocal quartet, the Songfellows. He explained to his father, "They told me I couldn't sing." Songfellow Jim Hamill later claimed that he was turned down because he did not demonstrate an ear for harmony at the time. In April, Presley began working for the Crown Electric company as a truck driver. His friend Ronnie Smith, after playing a few local gigs with him, suggested he contact Eddie Bond, leader of Smith's professional band, which had an opening for a vocalist. Bond rejected him after a tryout, advising Presley to stick to truck driving "because you're never going to make it as a singer".

Phillips, meanwhile, was always on the lookout for someone who could bring to a broader audience the sound of the black musicians on whom Sun focused. As Keisker reported, "Over and over I remember Sam saying, 'If I could find a white man who had the Negro sound and the Negro feel, I could make a billion dollars.'" In June, he acquired a demo recording by Jimmy Sweeney of a ballad, "Without You", that he thought might suit the teenage singer. Presley came by the studio but was unable to do it justice. Despite this, Phillips asked Presley to sing as many numbers as he knew. He was sufficiently affected by what he heard to invite two local musicians, guitarist Winfield "Scotty" Moore and upright bass player Bill Black, to work something up with Presley for a recording session.

The session held the evening of July 5, proved entirely unfruitful until late in the night. As they were about to abort and go home, Presley took his guitar and launched into a 1946 blues number, Arthur Crudup's "That's All Right". Moore recalled, "All of a sudden, Elvis just started singing this song, jumping around and acting the fool, and then Bill picked up his bass, and he started acting the fool, too, and I started playing with them. Sam, I think, had the door to the control booth open ... he stuck his head out and said, 'What are you doing?' And we said, 'We don't know.' 'Well, back up,' he said, 'try to find a place to start, and do it again. Phillips quickly began taping; this was the sound he had been looking for.

Three days later, popular Memphis DJ Dewey Phillips played "That's All Right" on his Red, Hot, and Blue show. Listeners began phoning in, eager to find out who the singer was. The interest was such that Phillips played the record repeatedly during the remaining two hours of his show. Interviewing Presley on-air, Phillips asked him what high school he attended to clarify his color for the many callers who had assumed that he was black. During the next few days, the trio recorded a bluegrass song, Bill Monroe's "Blue Moon of Kentucky", again in a distinctive style and employing a jury-rigged echo effect that Sam Phillips dubbed "slapback". A single was pressed with "That's All Right" on the A-side and "Blue Moon of Kentucky" on the reverse.

Early live performances and RCA Victor contract 
The trio played publicly for the first time on July 17 at the Bon Air club—Presley still sporting his child-size guitar. At the end of the month, they appeared at the Overton Park Shell, with Slim Whitman headlining. Here Elvis pioneered 'Rubber Legs', his signature style dance movement that he is best known for. A combination of his strong response to rhythm and nervousness at playing before a large crowd led Presley to shake his legs as he performed: his wide-cut pants emphasized his movements, causing young women in the audience to start screaming. Moore recalled, "During the instrumental parts, he would back off from the mike and be playing and shaking, and the crowd would just go wild". Black, a natural showman, whooped and rode his bass, hitting double licks that Presley would later remember as "really a wild sound, like a jungle drum or something".

Soon after, Moore and Black left their old band, the Starlite Wranglers, to play with Presley regularly, and DJ/promoter Bob Neal became the trio's manager. From August through October, they played frequently at the Eagle's Nest club and returned to Sun Studio for more recording sessions, and Presley quickly grew more confident on stage. According to Moore, "His movement was a natural thing, but he was also very conscious of what got a reaction. He'd do something one time and then he would expand on it real quick." Presley made what would be his only appearance on Nashville's Grand Ole Opry stage on October 2; after a polite audience response, Opry manager Jim Denny told Phillips that his singer was "not bad" but did not suit the program.

Louisiana Hayride, radio commercial, and first television performances 
In November 1954, Presley performed on Louisiana Hayride—the Oprys chief, and more adventurous, rival. The Shreveport-based show was broadcast to 198 radio stations in 28 states. He had another attack of nerves during the first set, which drew a muted reaction. A more composed and energetic second set inspired an enthusiastic response. House drummer D. J. Fontana brought a new element, complementing Presley's movements with accented beats that he had mastered playing in strip clubs. Soon after the show, the Hayride engaged Presley for a year's worth of Saturday-night appearances. Trading in his old guitar for $8 (and seeing it promptly dispatched to the garbage), he purchased a Martin instrument for $175, and his trio began playing in new locales, including Houston, Texas and Texarkana, Arkansas.

Many fledgling performers, like Minnie Pearl, Johnny Horton, and Johnny Cash, sang the praises of Louisiana Hayride sponsor, Southern Maid Donuts, including Presley, who developed a lifelong love of donuts. Presley made his singular product endorsement commercial for the donut company, which was never released, recording a radio jingle, "in exchange for a box of hot glazed doughnuts". Presley made his first television appearance on the KSLA-TV television broadcast of Louisiana Hayride. Soon after, he failed an audition for Arthur Godfrey's Talent Scouts on the CBS television network. By early 1955, Presley's regular Hayride appearances, constant touring, and well-received record releases had made him a regional star, from Tennessee to West Texas. 

In January, Neal signed a formal management contract with Presley and brought him to the attention of Colonel Tom Parker, whom he considered the best promoter in the music business. Parker, born in the Netherlands, had immigrated illegally to the United States and claimed to be from West Virginia; he had acquired an honorary colonel's commission from the Louisiana governor and country singer Jimmie Davis. Having successfully managed the top country star Eddy Arnold, Parker was working with the new number-one country singer, Hank Snow. Parker booked Presley on Snow's February tour. When the tour reached Odessa, Texas, a 19-year-old Roy Orbison saw Presley for the first time: "His energy was incredible, his instinct was just amazing. ... I just didn't know what to make of it. There was just no reference point in the culture to compare it." 

By August, Sun had released ten sides credited to "Elvis Presley, Scotty and Bill"; on the latest recordings, the trio were joined by a drummer. Some of the songs, like "That's All Right", were in what one Memphis journalist described as the "R&B idiom of negro field jazz"; others, like "Blue Moon of Kentucky", were "more in the country field", "but there was a curious blending of the two different musics in both". This blend of styles made it difficult for Presley's music to find radio airplay. According to Neal, many country-music disc jockeys would not play it because he sounded too much like a black artist and none of the rhythm-and-blues stations would touch him because "he sounded too much like a hillbilly." The blend came to be known as rockabilly. At the time, Presley was variously billed as "The King of Western Bop", "The Hillbilly Cat", and "The Memphis Flash".

Presley renewed Neal's management contract in August 1955, simultaneously appointing Parker as his special adviser. The group maintained an extensive touring schedule throughout the second half of the year. Neal recalled, "It was almost frightening, the reaction that came to Elvis from the teenaged boys. So many of them, through some sort of jealousy, would practically hate him. There were occasions in some towns in Texas when we'd have to be sure to have a police guard because somebody'd always try to take a crack at him. They'd get a gang and try to waylay him or something." The trio became a quartet when Hayride drummer Fontana joined as a full member. In mid-October, they played a few shows in support of Bill Haley, whose "Rock Around the Clock" track had been a number-one hit the previous year. Haley observed that Presley had a natural feel for rhythm, and advised him to sing fewer ballads.

At the Country Disc Jockey Convention in early November, Presley was voted the year's most promising male artist. Several record companies had by now shown interest in signing him. After three major labels made offers of up to $25,000, Parker and Phillips struck a deal with RCA Victor on November 21 to acquire Presley's Sun contract for an unprecedented $40,000. Presley, at 20, was still a minor, so his father signed the contract. Parker arranged with the owners of Hill & Range Publishing, Jean and Julian Aberbach, to create two entities, Elvis Presley Music and Gladys Music, to handle all the new material recorded by Presley. Songwriters were obliged to forgo one-third of their customary royalties in exchange for having him perform their compositions. By December, RCA Victor had begun to heavily promote its new singer, and before month's end had reissued many of his Sun recordings.

1956–1958: Commercial breakout and controversy

First national TV appearances and debut album 
On January 10, 1956, Presley made his first recordings for RCA Victor in Nashville. Extending Presley's by-now customary backup of Moore, Black, Fontana, and Hayride pianist Floyd Cramer—who had been performing at live club dates with Presley—RCA Victor enlisted guitarist Chet Atkins and three background singers, including Gordon Stoker of the popular Jordanaires quartet, to fill in the sound. The session produced the moody, unusual "Heartbreak Hotel", released as a single on January 27. Parker finally brought Presley to national television, booking him on CBS's Stage Show for six appearances over two months. The program, produced in New York, was hosted on alternate weeks by big band leaders and brothers Tommy and Jimmy Dorsey. After his first appearance, on January 28, Presley stayed in town to record at the RCA Victor New York studio. The sessions yielded eight songs, including a cover of Carl Perkins' rockabilly anthem "Blue Suede Shoes". In February, Presley's "I Forgot to Remember to Forget", a Sun recording initially released the previous August, reached the top of the Billboard country chart. Neal's contract was terminated, and, on March 2, Parker became Presley's manager.

RCA Victor released Presley's self-titled debut album on March 23. Joined by five previously unreleased Sun recordings, its seven recently recorded tracks were of a broad variety. There were two country songs and a bouncy pop tune. The others would centrally define the evolving sound of rock and roll: "Blue Suede Shoes"—"an improvement over Perkins' in almost every way", according to critic Robert Hilburn—and three R&B numbers that had been part of Presley's stage repertoire for some time, covers of Little Richard, Ray Charles, and The Drifters. As described by Hilburn, these "were the most revealing of all. Unlike many white artists ... who watered down the gritty edges of the original R&B versions of songs in the '50s, Presley reshaped them. He not only injected the tunes with his own vocal character but also made guitar, not piano, the lead instrument in all three cases." It became the first rock and roll album to top the Billboard chart, a position it held for 10 weeks. While Presley was not an innovative guitarist like Moore or contemporary African-American rockers Bo Diddley and Chuck Berry, cultural historian Gilbert B. Rodman argued that the album's cover image, "of Elvis having the time of his life on stage with a guitar in his hands played a crucial role in positioning the guitar ... as the instrument that best captured the style and spirit of this new music."

Milton Berle Show and "Hound Dog" 

On April 3, Presley made the first of two appearances on NBC's Milton Berle Show. His performance, on the deck of the USS Hancock in San Diego, California, prompted cheers and screams from an audience of sailors and their dates. A few days later, a flight taking Presley and his band to Nashville for a recording session left all three badly shaken when an engine died and the plane almost went down over Arkansas. Twelve weeks after its original release, "Heartbreak Hotel" became Presley's first number-one pop hit. In late April, Presley began a two-week residency at the New Frontier Hotel and Casino on the Las Vegas Strip. The shows were poorly received by the conservative, middle-aged hotel guests—"like a jug of corn liquor at a champagne party", wrote a critic for Newsweek. Amid his Vegas tenure, Presley, who had serious acting ambitions, signed a seven-year contract with Paramount Pictures. He began a tour of the Midwest in mid-May, taking in 15 cities in as many days. He had attended several shows by Freddie Bell and the Bellboys in Vegas and was struck by their cover of "Hound Dog", a hit in 1953 for blues singer Big Mama Thornton by songwriters Jerry Leiber and Mike Stoller. It became the new closing number of his act. After a show in La Crosse, Wisconsin, an urgent message on the letterhead of the local Catholic diocese's newspaper was sent to FBI director J. Edgar Hoover. It warned that "Presley is a definite danger to the security of the United States. ... [His] actions and motions were such as to rouse the sexual passions of teenaged youth. ... After the show, more than 1,000 teenagers tried to gang into Presley's room at the auditorium. ... Indications of the harm Presley did just in La Crosse were the two high school girls ... whose abdomen and thigh had Presley's autograph."

The second Milton Berle Show appearance came on June 5 at NBC's Hollywood studio, amid another hectic tour. Berle persuaded Presley to leave his guitar backstage, advising, "Let 'em see you, son." During the performance, Presley abruptly halted an uptempo rendition of "Hound Dog" with a wave of his arm and launched into a slow, grinding version accentuated with energetic, exaggerated body movements. Presley's gyrations created a storm of controversy. Television critics were outraged: Jack Gould of The New York Times wrote, "Mr. Presley has no discernible singing ability. ... His phrasing, if it can be called that, consists of the stereotyped variations that go with a beginner's aria in a bathtub. ... His one specialty is an accented movement of the body ... primarily identified with the repertoire of the blond bombshells of the burlesque runway." Ben Gross of the New York Daily News opined that popular music "has reached its lowest depths in the 'grunt and groin' antics of one Elvis Presley. ... Elvis, who rotates his pelvis ... gave an exhibition that was suggestive and vulgar, tinged with the kind of animalism that should be confined to dives and bordellos". Ed Sullivan, whose own variety show was the nation's most popular, declared him "unfit for family viewing". To Presley's displeasure, he soon found himself being referred to as "Elvis the Pelvis", which he called "one of the most childish expressions I ever heard, comin' from an adult".

Steve Allen Show and first Sullivan appearance 

The Berle shows drew such high ratings that Presley was booked for a July 1 appearance on NBC's Steve Allen Show in New York. Allen, no fan of rock and roll, introduced a "new Elvis" in a white bow tie and black tails. Presley sang "Hound Dog" for less than a minute to a basset hound wearing a top hat and bow tie. As described by television historian Jake Austen, "Allen thought Presley was talentless and absurd ... [he] set things up so that Presley would show his contrition". Allen later wrote that he found Presley's "strange, gangly, country-boy charisma, his hard-to-define cuteness, and his charming eccentricity intriguing" and simply worked him into the customary "comedy fabric" of his program. Just before the final rehearsal for the show, Presley told a reporter, "I'm holding down on this show. I don't want to do anything to make people dislike me. I think TV is important so I'm going to go along, but I won't be able to give the kind of show I do in a personal appearance." Presley would refer back to the Allen show as the most ridiculous performance of his career. Later that night, he appeared on Hy Gardner Calling, a popular local TV show. Pressed on whether he had learned anything from the criticism to which he was being subjected, Presley responded, "No, I haven't, I don't feel like I'm doing anything wrong. ... I don't see how any type of music would have any bad influence on people when it's only music. ... I mean, how would rock 'n' roll music make anyone rebel against their parents?"

The next day, Presley recorded "Hound Dog", along with "Any Way You Want Me" and "Don't Be Cruel". The Jordanaires sang harmony, as they had on The Steve Allen Show; they would work with Presley through the 1960s. A few days later, Presley made an outdoor concert appearance in Memphis, at which he announced, "You know, those people in New York are not gonna change me none. I'm gonna show you what the real Elvis is like tonight." In August, a judge in Jacksonville, Florida, ordered Presley to tame his act. Throughout the following performance, he largely kept still, except for wiggling his little finger suggestively in mockery of the order. The single pairing "Don't Be Cruel" with "Hound Dog" ruled the top of the charts for 11 weeks—a mark that would not be surpassed for 36 years. Recording sessions for Presley's second album took place in Hollywood during the first week of September. Leiber and Stoller, the writers of "Hound Dog", contributed "Love Me".

Allen's show with Presley had, for the first time, beaten CBS's Ed Sullivan Show in the ratings. Sullivan, despite his June pronouncement, booked Presley for three appearances for an unprecedented $50,000. The first, on September 9, 1956, was seen by approximately 60 million viewers—a record 82.6 percent of the television audience. Actor Charles Laughton hosted the show, filling in while Sullivan was recovering from a car accident. Presley appeared in two segments that night from CBS Television City in Los Angeles. According to Elvis legend, Presley was shot only from the waist up. Watching clips of the Allen and Berle shows with his producer, Sullivan had opined that Presley "got some kind of device hanging down below the crotch of his pants—so when he moves his legs back and forth you can see the outline of his cock. ... I think it's a Coke bottle. ... We just can't have this on a Sunday night. This is a family show!" Sullivan publicly told TV Guide, "As for his gyrations, the whole thing can be controlled with camera shots." In fact, Presley was shown head-to-toe in the first and second shows. Though the camerawork was relatively discreet during his debut, with leg-concealing closeups when he danced, the studio audience reacted in customary style: screaming. Presley's performance of his forthcoming single, the ballad "Love Me Tender", prompted a record-shattering million advance orders. More than any other single event, it was this first appearance on The Ed Sullivan Show that made Presley a national celebrity of barely precedented proportions.

Accompanying Presley's rise to fame, a cultural shift was taking place that he both helped inspire and came to symbolize. The historian Marty Jezer wrote that Presley began the "biggest pop craze" since Glenn Miller and Frank Sinatra  and brought rock and roll to mainstream culture: "As Presley set the artistic pace, other artists followed. ... Presley, more than anyone else, gave the young a belief in themselves as a distinct and somehow unified generation—the first in America ever to feel the power of an integrated youth culture."

Crazed crowds and film debut 

The audience response at Presley's live shows became increasingly fevered. Moore recalled, "He'd start out, 'You ain't nothin' but a Hound Dog,' and they'd just go to pieces. They'd always react the same way. There'd be a riot every time." At the two concerts he performed in September at the Mississippi–Alabama Fair and Dairy Show, 50 National Guardsmen were added to the police security to ensure that the crowd would not cause a ruckus. Elvis, Presley's second RCA Victor album, was released in October and quickly rose to number one on the billboard. The album includes "Old Shep", which he sang at the talent show in 1945, and which now marked the first time he played piano on an RCA Victor session. According to Guralnick, one can hear "in the halting chords and the somewhat stumbling rhythm both the unmistakable emotion and the equally unmistakable valuing of emotion over technique." Assessing the musical and cultural impact of Presley's recordings from "That's All Right" through Elvis, rock critic Dave Marsh wrote that "these records, more than any others, contain the seeds of what rock & roll was, has been and most likely what it may foreseeably become."

Presley returned to the Sullivan show at its main studio in New York, hosted this time by its namesake, on October 28. After the performance, crowds in Nashville and St. Louis burned him in effigy. His first motion picture, Love Me Tender, was released on November 21. Though he was not top-billed, the film's original title—The Reno Brothers—was changed to capitalize on his latest number-one record: "Love Me Tender" had hit the top of the charts earlier that month. To further take advantage of Presley's popularity, four musical numbers were added to what was originally a straight acting role. The film was panned by critics but did very well at the box office. Presley would receive top billing on every subsequent film he made.

On December 4, Presley dropped into Sun Records where Carl Perkins and Jerry Lee Lewis were recording and had an impromptu jam session along with Johnny Cash. Though Phillips no longer had the right to release any Presley material, he made sure that the session was captured on tape. The results, none officially released for 25 years, became known as the "Million Dollar Quartet" recordings. The year ended with a front-page story in The Wall Street Journal reporting that Presley merchandise had brought in $22 million on top of his record sales, and Billboards declaration that he had placed more songs in the top 100 than any other artist since records were first charted. In his first full year at RCA Victor, then the record industry's largest company, Presley had accounted for over 50 percent of the label's singles sales.

Leiber and Stoller collaboration and draft notice 

Presley made his third and final Ed Sullivan Show appearance on January 6, 1957—on this occasion indeed shot only down to the waist. Some commentators have claimed that Parker orchestrated an appearance of censorship to generate publicity. In any event, as critic Greil Marcus describes, Presley "did not tie himself down. Leaving behind the bland clothes he had worn on the first two shows, he stepped out in the outlandish costume of a pasha, if not a harem girl. From the make-up over his eyes, the hair falling in his face, the overwhelmingly sexual cast of his mouth, he was playing Rudolph Valentino in The Sheik, with all stops out." To close, displaying his range and defying Sullivan's wishes, Presley sang a gentle black spiritual, "Peace in the Valley". At the end of the show, Sullivan declared Presley "a real decent, fine boy". Two days later, the Memphis draft board announced that Presley would be classified 1-A and would probably be drafted sometime that year.

Each of the three Presley singles released in the first half of 1957 went to number one: "Too Much", "All Shook Up", and "(Let Me Be Your) Teddy Bear". Already an international star, he was attracting fans even where his music was not officially released. Under the headline "Presley Records a Craze in Soviet", The New York Times reported that pressings of his music on discarded X-ray plates were commanding high prices in Leningrad. Between film shoots and recording sessions, Presley purchased an 18-room mansion, Graceland, on March 19, 1957, for the amount of $102,500. Before the purchase, Elvis recorded Loving You—the soundtrack to his second film, which was released in July. It was Presley's third straight number-one album. The title track was written by Leiber and Stoller, who were then retained to write four of the six songs recorded at the sessions for Jailhouse Rock, Presley's next film. The songwriting team effectively produced the Jailhouse sessions and developed a close working relationship with Presley, who came to regard them as his "good-luck charm". "He was fast," said Leiber. "Any demo you gave him he knew by heart in ten minutes." The title track became another number-one hit, as was the Jailhouse Rock EP.

Presley undertook three brief tours during the year, continuing to generate a crazed audience response. A Detroit newspaper suggested that "the trouble with going to see Elvis Presley is that you're liable to get killed". Villanova students pelted him with eggs in Philadelphia, and in Vancouver the crowd rioted after the end of the show, destroying the stage. Frank Sinatra, who had inspired both the swooning and screaming of teenage girls in the 1940s, condemned the new musical phenomenon. In a magazine article, he decried rock and roll as "brutal, ugly, degenerate, vicious. ... It fosters almost totally negative and destructive reactions in young people. It smells phoney and false. It is sung, played and written, for the most part, by cretinous goons. ... This rancid-smelling aphrodisiac I deplore." Asked for a response, Presley said, "I admire the man. He has a right to say what he wants to say. He is a great success and a fine actor, but I think he shouldn't have said it. ... This is a trend, just the same as he faced when he started years ago."

Leiber and Stoller were again in the studio for the recording of Elvis' Christmas Album. Toward the end of the session, they wrote a song on the spot at Presley's request: "Santa Claus Is Back in Town", an innuendo-laden blues. The holiday release stretched Presley's string of number-one albums to four and would become the best-selling Christmas album ever in the United States, with eventual sales of over 20 million worldwide. After the session, Moore and Black—drawing only modest weekly salaries, sharing in none of Presley's massive financial success—resigned. Though they were brought back on a per diem basis a few weeks later, it was clear that they had not been part of Presley's inner circle for some time. On December 20, Presley received his draft notice. He was granted a deferment to finish the forthcoming King Creole, in which $350,000 had already been invested by Paramount and producer Hal Wallis. A couple of weeks into the new year, "Don't", another Leiber and Stoller tune, became Presley's tenth number-one seller. It had been only 21 months since "Heartbreak Hotel" had brought him to the top for the first time. Recording sessions for the King Creole soundtrack were held in Hollywood in mid-January 1958. Leiber and Stoller provided three songs and were again on hand, but it would be the last time Presley and the duo worked closely together. As Stoller later recalled, Presley's manager and entourage sought to wall him off: "He was removed. ... They kept him separate." A brief soundtrack session on February 11 marked another ending—it was the final occasion on which Black was to perform with Presley. He died in 1965.

1958–1960: Military service and mother's death 

On March 24, 1958, Presley was drafted into the United States Army at Fort Chaffee, Arkansas. His arrival was a major media event. Hundreds of people descended on Presley as he stepped from the bus; photographers then accompanied him into the installation. Presley announced that he was looking forward to his military stint, saying that he did not want to be treated any differently from anyone else: "The Army can do anything it wants with me."

Between March 28 and September 17, 1958, Presley completed basic and advanced military training at Fort Hood, Texas, where he was temporarily assigned to Company A, 2d Medium Tank Battalion, 37th Armor. During the two weeks' leave between his basic and advanced training in early June, Presley recorded five songs in Nashville. In early August, his mother was diagnosed with hepatitis, and her condition rapidly worsened. Presley was granted emergency leave to visit her and arrived in Memphis on August 12. Two days later, she died of heart failure at age 46. Presley was devastated and never the same; their relationship had remained extremely close—even into his adulthood, they would use baby talk with each other and Presley would address her with pet names.

On October 1, 1958, Presley was assigned to the 1st Medium Tank Battalion, 32d Armor, 3d Armored Division, at Ray Barracks, Germany, where he served as an armor intelligence specialist. On November 27, he was promoted to private first class and on June 1, 1959, to specialist fourth class. While on maneuvers, Presley was introduced to amphetamines by another soldier. He became "practically evangelical about their benefits", not only for energy but for "strength" and weight loss, and many of his friends in the outfit joined him in indulging. The Army also introduced Presley to karate, which he studied seriously, training with Jürgen Seydel. It became a lifelong interest, which he later included in his live performances. Fellow soldiers have attested to Presley's wish to be seen as an able, ordinary soldier, despite his fame, and to his generosity. He donated his Army pay to charity, purchased TV sets for the base, and bought an extra set of fatigues for everyone in his outfit. Presley was promoted to sergeant on February 11, 1960.

While in Bad Nauheim, Germany, Presley, 24 at the time, met 14-year-old Priscilla Beaulieu. Priscilla said that due to their age difference, when they met, he told her: "Why, you’re just a baby.” They would eventually marry after a seven-and-a-half-year courtship. In her autobiography, Priscilla said that Presley was concerned that his 24-month spell as a G.I. would ruin his career. In Special Services, he would have been able to give musical performances and remain in touch with the public, but Parker had convinced him that to gain popular respect, he should serve his country as a regular soldier. Media reports echoed Presley's concerns about his career, but RCA Victor producer Steve Sholes and Freddy Bienstock of Hill and Range had carefully prepared for his two-year hiatus. Armed with a substantial amount of unreleased material, they kept up a regular stream of successful releases. Between his induction and discharge, Presley had ten top 40 hits, including "Wear My Ring Around Your Neck", the bestselling "Hard Headed Woman", and "One Night" in 1958, and "(Now and Then There's) A Fool Such as I" and the number-one "A Big Hunk o' Love" in 1959. RCA Victor also generated four albums compiling previously issued material during this period, most successfully Elvis' Golden Records (1958), which hit number three on the LP chart.

1960–1968: Focus on films

Elvis Is Back 

Presley returned to the United States on March 2, 1960, and was honorably discharged three days later. The train that carried him from New Jersey to Tennessee was mobbed all the way, and Presley was called upon to appear at scheduled stops to please his fans. On the night of March 20, he entered RCA Victor's Nashville studio to cut tracks for a new album along with a single, "Stuck on You", which was rushed into release and swiftly became a number-one hit. Another Nashville session two weeks later yielded a pair of his bestselling singles, the ballads "It's Now or Never" and "Are You Lonesome Tonight?", along with the rest of Elvis Is Back! The album features several songs described by Greil Marcus as full of Chicago blues "menace, driven by Presley's own super-miked acoustic guitar, brilliant playing by Scotty Moore, and demonic sax work from Boots Randolph. Elvis' singing wasn't sexy, it was pornographic." As a whole, the record "conjured up the vision of a performer who could be all things", according to music historian John Robertson: "a flirtatious teenage idol with a heart of gold; a tempestuous, dangerous lover; a gutbucket blues singer; a sophisticated nightclub entertainer; [a] raucous rocker". Released only days after recording was complete, it reached number two on the album chart.

Presley returned to television on May 12 as a guest on The Frank Sinatra Timex Special—ironic for both stars, given Sinatra's earlier excoriation of rock and roll. Also known as Welcome Home Elvis, the show had been taped in late March, the only time all year Presley performed in front of an audience. Parker secured an unheard-of $125,000 fee for eight minutes of singing. The broadcast drew an enormous viewership.

G.I. Blues, the soundtrack to Presley's first film since his return, was a number-one album in October. His first LP of sacred material, His Hand in Mine, followed two months later. It reached number 13 on the US pop chart and number 3 in the UK, remarkable figures for a gospel album. In February 1961, Presley performed two shows for a benefit event in Memphis, on behalf of 24 local charities. During a luncheon preceding the event, RCA Victor presented him with a plaque certifying worldwide sales of over 75 million records. A 12-hour Nashville session in mid-March yielded nearly all of Presley's next studio album, Something for Everybody. As described by John Robertson, it exemplifies the Nashville sound, the restrained, cosmopolitan style that would define country music in the 1960s. Presaging much of what was to come from Presley himself over the next half-decade, the album is largely "a pleasant, unthreatening pastiche of the music that had once been Elvis' birthright". It would be his sixth number-one LP. Another benefit concert, raising money for a Pearl Harbor memorial, was staged on March 25, in Hawaii. It was to be Presley's last public performance for seven years.

Lost in Hollywood 
Parker had by now pushed Presley into a heavy filmmaking schedule, focused on formulaic, modestly budgeted musical comedies. Presley, at first, insisted on pursuing higher roles, but when two films in a more dramatic vein—Flaming Star (1960) and Wild in the Country (1961)—were less commercially successful, he reverted to the formula. Among the 27 films he made during the 1960s, there were a few further exceptions. His films were almost universally panned; critic Andrew Caine dismissed them as a "pantheon of bad taste". Nonetheless, they were virtually all profitable. Hal Wallis, who produced nine of them, declared, "A Presley picture is the only sure thing in Hollywood."

Of Presley's films in the 1960s, 15 were accompanied by soundtrack albums and another 5 by soundtrack EPs. The films' rapid production and release schedules—he frequently starred in three a year—affected his music. According to Jerry Leiber, the soundtrack formula was already evident before Presley left for the Army: "three ballads, one medium-tempo [number], one up-tempo, and one break blues boogie". As the decade wore on, the quality of the soundtrack songs grew "progressively worse". Julie Parrish, who appeared in Paradise, Hawaiian Style (1966), says that he disliked many of the songs chosen for his films. The Jordanaires' Gordon Stoker describes how Presley would retreat from the studio microphone: "The material was so bad that he felt like he couldn't sing it." Most of the film albums featured a song or two from respected writers such as the team of Doc Pomus and Mort Shuman. But by and large, according to biographer Jerry Hopkins, the numbers seemed to be "written on order by men who never really understood Elvis or rock and roll". Regardless of the songs' quality, it has been argued that Presley generally sang them well, with commitment. Critic Dave Marsh heard the opposite: "Presley isn't trying, probably the wisest course in the face of material like 'No Room to Rumba in a Sports Car' and 'Rock-A-Hula Baby'."

In the first half of the decade, three of Presley's soundtrack albums were ranked number one on the pop charts, and a few of his most popular songs came from his films, such as "Can't Help Falling in Love" (1961) and "Return to Sender" (1962). ("Viva Las Vegas", the title track to the 1964 film, was a minor hit as a B-side, and became truly popular only later). But, as with artistic merit, the commercial returns steadily diminished. During a five-year span—1964 through 1968—Presley had only one top-ten hit: "Crying in the Chapel" (1965), a gospel number recorded back in 1960. As for non-film albums, between the June 1962 release of Pot Luck and the November 1968 release of the soundtrack to the television special that signaled his comeback, only one LP of new material by Presley was issued: the gospel album How Great Thou Art (1967). It won him his first Grammy Award, for Best Sacred Performance. As Marsh described, Presley was "arguably the greatest white gospel singer of his time [and] really the last rock & roll artist to make gospel as vital a component of his musical personality as his secular songs".

Shortly before Christmas 1966, more than seven years since they first met, Presley proposed to Priscilla Beaulieu. They were married on May 1, 1967, in a brief ceremony in their suite at the Aladdin Hotel in Las Vegas. The flow of formulaic films and assembly-line soundtracks rolled on. It was not until October 1967, when the Clambake soundtrack LP registered record low sales for a new Presley album, that RCA executives recognized a problem. "By then, of course, the damage had been done", as historians Connie Kirchberg and Marc Hendrickx put it. "Elvis was viewed as a joke by serious music lovers and a has-been to all but his most loyal fans."

1968–1973: Comeback

Elvis: the '68 Comeback Special 

Presley's only child, Lisa Marie, was born on February 1, 1968, during a period when he had grown deeply unhappy with his career. Of the eight Presley singles released between January 1967 and May 1968, only two charted in the top 40, and none higher than number 28. His forthcoming soundtrack album, Speedway, would rank at number 82 on the Billboard chart. Parker had already shifted his plans to television, where Presley had not appeared since the Sinatra Timex show in 1960. He maneuvered a deal with NBC that committed the network to both finance a theatrical feature and broadcast a Christmas special.

Recorded in late June in Burbank, California, the special, simply called Elvis, aired on December 3, 1968. Later known as the '68 Comeback Special, the show featured lavishly staged studio productions as well as songs performed with a band in front of a small audience—Presley's first live performances since 1961. The live segments saw Presley dressed in tight black leather, singing and playing guitar in an uninhibited style reminiscent of his early rock and roll days. Director and co-producer Steve Binder had worked hard to produce a show that was far from the hour of Christmas songs Parker had originally planned. The show, NBC's highest-rated that season, captured 42 percent of the total viewing audience. Jon Landau of Eye magazine remarked, "There is something magical about watching a man who has lost himself find his way back home. He sang with the kind of power people no longer expect of rock 'n' roll singers. He moved his body with a lack of pretension and effort that must have made Jim Morrison green with envy." Dave Marsh calls the performance one of "emotional grandeur and historical resonance".

By January 1969, the single "If I Can Dream", written for the special, reached number 12. The soundtrack album rose into the top ten. According to friend Jerry Schilling, the special reminded Presley of what "he had not been able to do for years, being able to choose the people; being able to choose what songs and not being told what had to be on the soundtrack. ... He was out of prison, man." Binder said of Presley's reaction, "I played Elvis the 60-minute show, and he told me in the screening room, 'Steve, it's the greatest thing I've ever done in my life. I give you my word I will never sing a song I don't believe in.

From Elvis in Memphis and the International 

Buoyed by the experience of the Comeback Special, Presley engaged in a prolific series of recording sessions at American Sound Studio, which led to the acclaimed From Elvis in Memphis. Released in June 1969, it was his first secular, non-soundtrack album from a dedicated period in the studio in eight years. As described by Dave Marsh, it is "a masterpiece in which Presley immediately catches up with pop music trends that had seemed to pass him by during the movie years. He sings country songs, soul songs and rockers with real conviction, a stunning achievement." The album featured the hit single "In the Ghetto", issued in April, which reached number three on the pop chart—Presley's first non-gospel top ten hit since "Bossa Nova Baby" in 1963. Further hit singles were culled from the American Sound sessions: "Suspicious Minds", "Don't Cry Daddy", and "Kentucky Rain".

Presley was keen to resume regular live performing. Following the success of the Comeback Special, offers came in from around the world. The London Palladium offered Parker  for a one-week engagement. He responded, "That's fine for me, now how much can you get for Elvis?" In May, the brand-new International Hotel in Las Vegas, boasting the largest showroom in the city, announced that it had booked Presley. He was scheduled to perform 57 shows over four weeks, beginning July 31. Moore, Fontana, and the Jordanaires declined to participate, afraid of losing the lucrative session work they had in Nashville. Presley assembled new, top-notch accompaniment, led by guitarist James Burton and including two gospel groups, The Imperials and Sweet Inspirations. Costume designer Bill Belew, responsible for the intense leather styling of the Comeback Special, created a new stage look for Presley, inspired by Presley's passion for karate. Nonetheless, he was nervous: his only previous Las Vegas engagement, in 1956, had been dismal. Parker, who intended to make Presley's return the show business event of the year, oversaw a major promotional push. For his part, International Hotel owner Kirk Kerkorian arranged to send his own plane to New York to fly in rock journalists for the debut performance.

Presley took to the stage without introduction. The audience of 2,200, including many celebrities, gave him a standing ovation before he sang a note and another after his performance. A third followed his encore, "Can't Help Falling in Love" (a song that would be his closing number for much of his remaining life). At a press conference after the show, when a journalist referred to him as "The King", Presley gestured toward Fats Domino, who was taking in the scene. "No," Presley said, "that's the real king of rock and roll." The next day, Parker's negotiations with the hotel resulted in a five-year contract for Presley to play each February and August, at an annual salary of $1 million. Newsweek commented, "There are several unbelievable things about Elvis, but the most incredible is his staying power in a world where meteoric careers fade like shooting stars." Rolling Stone called Presley "supernatural, his own resurrection." In November, Presley's final non-concert film, Change of Habit, opened. The double album From Memphis to Vegas/From Vegas to Memphis came out the same month; the first LP consisted of live performances from the International, the second of more cuts from the American Sound sessions. "Suspicious Minds" reached the top of the charts—Presley's first US pop number-one in over seven years, and his last.

Cassandra Peterson, later television's Elvira, met Presley during this period in Las Vegas, where she was working as a showgirl. She recalled of their encounter, "He was so anti-drug when I met him. I mentioned to him that I smoked marijuana, and he was just appalled. He said, 'Don't ever do that again. Presley was not only deeply opposed to recreational drugs, he also rarely drank. Several of his family members had been alcoholics, a fate he intended to avoid.

Back on tour and meeting Nixon 
Presley returned to the International early in 1970 for the first of the year's two-month-long engagements, performing two shows a night. Recordings from these shows were issued on the album On Stage. In late February, Presley performed six attendance-record–breaking shows at the Houston Astrodome. In April, the single "The Wonder of You" was issued—a number one hit in the UK, it topped the US adult contemporary chart, as well. Metro-Goldwyn-Mayer filmed rehearsal and concert footage at the International during August for the documentary Elvis: That's the Way It Is. Presley was performing in a jumpsuit, which would become a trademark of his live act. During this engagement, he was threatened with murder unless  was paid. Presley had been the target of many threats since the 1950s, often without his knowledge. The FBI took the threat seriously and security was stepped up for the next two shows. Presley went onstage with a Derringer in his right boot and a .45 pistol in his waistband, but the concerts succeeded without any incidents.

The album, That's the Way It Is, produced to accompany the documentary and featuring both studio and live recordings, marked a stylistic shift. As music historian John Robertson noted, "The authority of Presley's singing helped disguise the fact that the album stepped decisively away from the American-roots inspiration of the Memphis sessions towards a more middle-of-the-road sound. With country put on the back burner, and soul and R&B left in Memphis, what was left was very classy, very clean white pop—perfect for the Las Vegas crowd, but a definite retrograde step for Elvis." After the end of his International engagement on September 7, Presley embarked on a week-long concert tour, largely of the South, his first since 1958. Another week-long tour, of the West Coast, followed in November.

On December 21, 1970, Presley engineered a meeting with President Richard Nixon at the White House, where he expressed his patriotism and explained how he believed he could reach out to the hippies to help combat the drug culture he and the president abhorred. He asked Nixon for a Bureau of Narcotics and Dangerous Drugs badge, to add to similar items he had begun collecting and to signify official sanction of his patriotic efforts. Nixon, who apparently found the encounter awkward, expressed a belief that Presley could send a positive message to young people and that it was, therefore, important that he "retain his credibility". Presley told Nixon that the Beatles, whose songs he regularly performed in concert during the era, exemplified what he saw as a trend of anti-Americanism. Presley and his friends previously had a four-hour get-together with the Beatles at his home in Bel Air, California, in August 1965. On hearing reports of the meeting, Paul McCartney later said that he "felt a bit betrayed. ... The great joke was that we were taking [illegal] drugs, and look what happened to him", a reference to Presley's early death, linked to prescription drug abuse.

The US Junior Chamber of Commerce named Presley one of its annual Ten Most Outstanding Young Men of the Nation on January 16, 1971. Not long after, the City of Memphis named the stretch of Highway 51 South on which Graceland is located "Elvis Presley Boulevard". The same year, Presley became the first rock and roll singer to be awarded the Lifetime Achievement Award (then known as the Bing Crosby Award) by the National Academy of Recording Arts and Sciences, the Grammy Award organization. Three new, non-film Presley studio albums were released in 1971, as many as had come out over the previous eight years. Best received by critics was Elvis Country, a concept record that focused on genre standards. The biggest seller was Elvis Sings The Wonderful World of Christmas, "the truest statement of all", according to Greil Marcus. "In the midst of ten painfully genteel Christmas songs, every one sung with appalling sincerity and humility, one could find Elvis tom-catting his way through six blazing minutes of "Merry Christmas Baby", a raunchy old Charles Brown blues. ... If [Presley's] sin was his lifelessness, it was his sinfulness that brought him to life".

Marriage breakdown and Aloha from Hawaii 
MGM again filmed Presley in April 1972, this time for Elvis on Tour, which went on to win the Golden Globe Award for Best Documentary Film for that year's Golden Globe Awards. His gospel album He Touched Me, released that month, would earn him his second Grammy Award for Best Inspirational Performance, for that year's Grammy Awards. A 14-date tour commenced with an unprecedented four consecutive sold-out shows at New York's Madison Square Garden. The evening concert on July 10 was recorded and issued in an LP form a week later. Elvis: As Recorded at Madison Square Garden became one of Presley's biggest-selling albums. After the tour, the single "Burning Love" was released—Presley's last top ten hit on the US pop chart. "The most exciting single Elvis has made since 'All Shook Up'", wrote rock critic Robert Christgau. "Who else could make 'It's coming closer, the flames are now licking my body' sound like an assignation with James Brown's backup band?"

Presley and his wife, meanwhile, had become increasingly distant, barely cohabiting. In 1971, an affair he had with Joyce Bova resulted—unbeknownst to him—in her pregnancy and an abortion. He often raised the possibility of her moving into Graceland, saying that he was likely to leave Priscilla. The Presleys separated on February 23, 1972, after Priscilla disclosed her relationship with Mike Stone, a karate instructor Presley had recommended to her. Priscilla related that when she told him, Presley "grabbed ... and forcefully made love to" her, declaring, "This is how a real man makes love to his woman". She later stated in an interview that she regretted her choice of words in describing the incident, and said it had been an overstatement. Five months later, Presley's new girlfriend, Linda Thompson, a songwriter and one-time Memphis beauty queen, moved in with him. Presley and his wife filed for divorce on August 18. According to Joe Moscheo of the Imperials, the failure of Presley's marriage "was a blow from which he never recovered". At a rare press conference that June, a reporter had asked Presley whether he was satisfied with his image. Presley replied, "Well, the image is one thing and the human being another ... it's very hard to live up to an image."

In January 1973, Presley performed two benefit concerts for the Kui Lee Cancer Fund in connection with a groundbreaking TV special, Aloha from Hawaii, which would be the first concert by a solo artist to be aired globally. The first show served as a practice run and backup should technical problems affect the live broadcast two days later. On January 14, Aloha from Hawaii aired live via satellite to prime-time audiences in Japan, South Korea, Thailand, the Philippines, Australia, and New Zealand, as well as to US servicemen based across Southeast Asia. In Japan, where it capped a nationwide Elvis Presley Week, it smashed viewing records. The next night, it was simulcast to 28 European countries, and in April an extended version finally aired in the US, where it won a 57 percent share of the TV audience. Over time, Parker's claim that it was seen by one billion or more people would be broadly accepted, but that figure appeared to have been sheer invention. Presley's stage costume became the most recognized example of the elaborate concert garb with which his latter-day persona became closely associated. As described by Bobbie Ann Mason, "At the end of the show, when he spreads out his American Eagle cape, with the full stretched wings of the eagle studded on the back, he becomes a god figure." The accompanying double album, released in February, went to number one and eventually sold over 5 million copies in the United States. It was Presley's last US number-one pop album during his lifetime.

At a midnight show the same month, four men rushed onto the stage in an apparent attack. Security men came to Presley's defense, and he ejected one invader from the stage himself. Following the show, he became obsessed with the idea that the men had been sent by Mike Stone to kill him. Though they were shown to have been only overexuberant fans, he raged, "There's too much pain in me ... Stone [must] die." His outbursts continued with such intensity that a physician was unable to calm him, despite administering large doses of medication. After another two full days of raging, Red West, his friend and bodyguard, felt compelled to get a price for a contract killing and was relieved when Presley decided, "Aw hell, let's just leave it for now. Maybe it's a bit heavy."

1973–1977: Health deterioration and death

Medical crises and last studio sessions 
Presley's divorce was finalized on October 9, 1973. By then, his health was in serious decline. Twice during the year, he overdosed on barbiturates, spending three days in a coma in his hotel suite after the first incident. Towards the end of 1973, he was hospitalized, semi-comatose from the effects of a pethidine addiction. According to his primary care physician, Dr. George C. Nichopoulos, Presley "felt that by getting drugs from a doctor, he wasn't the common everyday junkie getting something off the street". Since his comeback, he had staged more live shows with each passing year, and 1973 saw 168 concerts, his busiest schedule ever. Despite his failing health, in 1974, he undertook another intensive touring schedule.

Presley's condition declined precipitously in September. Keyboardist Tony Brown remembered Presley's arrival at a University of Maryland concert: "He fell out of the limousine, to his knees. People jumped to help, and he pushed them away like, 'Don't help me.' He walked on stage and held onto the mic for the first thirty minutes like it was a post. Everybody's looking at each other like, 'Is the tour gonna happen'?" Guitarist John Wilkinson recalled, "He was all gut. He was slurring. He was so fucked up. ... It was obvious he was drugged. It was obvious there was something terribly wrong with his body. It was so bad the words to the songs were barely intelligible. ... I remember crying. He could barely get through the introductions." 

Wilkinson recounted that a few nights later in Detroit, "I watched him in his dressing room, just draped over a chair, unable to move. So often I thought, 'Boss, why don't you just cancel this tour and take a year off ...?' I mentioned something once in a guarded moment. He patted me on the back and said, 'It'll be all right. Don't you worry about it. Presley continued to play to sellout crowds. Cultural critic Marjorie Garber wrote that he was now widely seen as a garish pop crooner: "In effect, he had become Liberace. Even his fans were now middle-aged matrons and blue-haired grandmothers."

On July 13, 1976, Presley's father—who had become deeply involved in his financial affairs—fired "Memphis Mafia" bodyguards Red West (Presley's friend since the 1950s), Sonny West, and David Hebler, citing the need to "cut back on expenses". Presley was in Palm Springs at the time, and some suggested that he was too cowardly to face the three himself. Another associate of Presley's, John O'Grady, argued that the bodyguards were dropped because their rough treatment of fans had prompted too many lawsuits. However, Presley's stepbrother, David Stanley, claimed that the bodyguards were fired because they were becoming more outspoken about Presley's drug dependency.

RCA, which had always enjoyed a steady stream of product from Presley, began to grow anxious as his interest in the recording studio waned. After a session in December 1973 that produced 18 songs, enough for almost two albums, Presley made no official studio recordings in 1974. Parker delivered RCA another concert record, Elvis Recorded Live on Stage in Memphis. Recorded on March 20, it included a version of "How Great Thou Art" that won Presley his third and final Grammy Award for Best Inspirational Performance at that year's Grammy Awards. All three of his competitive Grammy winsout of 14 total nominationswere for gospel recordings. Presley returned to the recording studio in Hollywood in March 1975, but Parker's attempts to arrange another session toward the end of the year were unsuccessful. In 1976, RCA sent a mobile recording unit to Graceland that made possible two full-scale recording sessions at Presley's home. However, the recording process had become a struggle for him.

Despite concerns from RCA and Parker, between July 1973 and October 1976, Presley recorded virtually the entire contents of six albums. Though he was no longer a major presence on the pop charts, five of those albums entered the top five of the country albums chart, and three went to number one: Promised Land (1975), From Elvis Presley Boulevard, Memphis, Tennessee (1976), and Moody Blue (1977). 

Though Presley's singles in this era were not major pop hits, he remained a significant force in the country and adult contemporary markets. Eight studio singles from this period released during his lifetime were top ten hits on one or both charts, four in 1974 alone. "My Boy" was a number-one adult contemporary hit in 1975, and "Moody Blue" topped the country singles chart and reached the second spot on the adult contemporary chart in 1976. Perhaps his most critically acclaimed recording of the era came that year, with what Greil Marcus described as his "apocalyptic attack" on the soul classic "Hurt". Dave Marsh wrote of Presley's performance: "If he felt the way he sounded, the wonder isn't that he had only a year left to live but that he managed to survive that long."

Presley and Linda Thompson split in November 1976, and Presley took up with a new girlfriend, Ginger Alden. He proposed to Alden and gave her an engagement ring two months later, though several of his friends later said he had no serious intention of marrying again.

Final months 
The journalist Tony Scherman wrote that, by early 1977, "Presley had become a grotesque caricature of his sleek, energetic former self. Grossly overweight, his mind dulled by the pharmacopia he daily ingested, he was barely able to pull himself through his abbreviated concerts." According to Andy Greene of Rolling Stone, Presley's final performances were mostly "sad, sloppy affairs where a bloated, drugged Presley struggled to remember his lyrics and get through the night without collapsing ... Most everything from the final three years of his life is sad and hard to watch." In Alexandria, Louisiana, he was on stage for less than an hour and "was impossible to understand". On March 31, Presley canceled a performance in Baton Rouge, unable to get out of his hotel bed; four shows had to be canceled and rescheduled.

Despite the accelerating deterioration of his health, Presley fulfilled most of his touring commitments. According to Guralnick, fans "were becoming increasingly voluble about their disappointment, but it all seemed to go right past Presley, whose world was now confined almost entirely to his room and his spiritualism books". Presley's cousin, Billy Smith, recalled how he would sit in his room and chat for hours, sometimes recounting favorite Monty Python sketches and his past escapades, but more often gripped by paranoid obsessions that reminded Smith of the billionaire recluse Howard Hughes.

"Way Down", Presley's last single issued during his lifetime, was released on June 6, 1977. That month, CBS taped two concerts for a TV special, Elvis in Concert, to be broadcast in October. In the first, shot in Omaha on June 19, Presley's voice, Guralnick writes, "is almost unrecognizable, a small, childlike instrument in which he talks more than sings most of the songs, casts about uncertainly for the melody in others, and is virtually unable to articulate or project". Two days later, in Rapid City, South Dakota, "he looked healthier, seemed to have lost a little weight, and sounded better, too", though, by the conclusion of the performance, his face was "framed in a helmet of blue-black hair from which sweat sheets down over pale, swollen cheeks". Presley's final concert was held in Indianapolis at Market Square Arena, on June 26, 1977.

The book Elvis: What Happened?, co-written by the three bodyguards fired the previous year, was published on August 1. It was the first exposé to detail Presley's years of drug misuse. He was devastated by the book, and tried unsuccessfully to halt its publication by offering money to the publishers. By this point he suffered from glaucoma, hypertension, liver damage, and an enlarged colon, each magnified—and possibly caused—by drug abuse.

Death

On the evening of August 16, 1977, Presley was scheduled to fly out of Memphis to begin another tour. That afternoon, Ginger Alden discovered him in an unresponsive state on the bathroom floor of his Graceland mansion. "For some reason — perhaps involving a reaction to the codeine and attempts to move his bowels — he experienced pain and fright while sitting on the toilet. Alarmed, he stood up ... and fell face down in the fetal position." Drooling on the rug and "unable to breathe, he died." Attempts to revive him failed, and he was pronounced dead at Baptist Memorial Hospital at 3:30 p.m. He was 42 years old.

President Jimmy Carter issued a statement that credited Presley with having "permanently changed the face of American popular culture". Thousands of people gathered outside Graceland to view the open casket. One of Presley's cousins, Billy Mann, accepted  to secretly photograph the body; the picture appeared on the cover of the National Enquirers biggest-selling issue ever. Alden struck a $105,000 deal with the Enquirer for her story, but settled for less when she broke her exclusivity agreement. Presley left her nothing in his will.

Presley's funeral was held at Graceland on Thursday, August 18. Outside the gates, a car plowed into a group of fans, killing two young women and critically injuring a third. About 80,000 people lined the processional route to Forest Hill Cemetery, where Presley was buried next to his mother. Within a few weeks, "Way Down" topped the country and UK singles chart. Following an attempt to steal Presley's body in late August, the remains of both Presley and his mother were exhumed and reburied in Graceland's Meditation Garden on October 2. Presley is buried alongside his parents, daughter, grandson and his paternal grandmother in the Meditation Garden at Graceland.

Cause of death 
While an autopsy, undertaken the same day Presley died, was still in progress, Memphis medical examiner Jerry Francisco announced that the immediate cause of death was cardiac arrest. Asked if drugs were involved, he declared that "drugs played no role in Presley's death". In fact, "drug use was heavily implicated" in Presley's death, writes Guralnick. The pathologists conducting the autopsy thought it possible, for instance, that he had suffered "anaphylactic shock brought on by the codeine pills he had gotten from his dentist, to which he was known to have had a mild allergy". A pair of lab reports filed two months later strongly suggested that polypharmacy was the primary cause of death; one reported "fourteen drugs in Elvis' system, ten in significant quantity". In 1979, forensic pathologist Cyril Wecht conducted a review of the reports and concluded that a combination of central nervous system depressants had resulted in Presley's accidental death. Forensic historian and pathologist Michael Baden viewed the situation as complicated: "Elvis had had an enlarged heart for a long time. That, together with his drug habit, caused his death. But he was difficult to diagnose; it was a judgment call."

The competence and ethics of two of the centrally involved medical professionals were seriously questioned. Francisco had offered a cause of death before the autopsy was complete; claimed the underlying ailment was cardiac arrhythmia, a condition that can be determined only in someone who is still alive; and denied drugs played any part in Presley's death before the toxicology results were known. Allegations of a cover-up were widespread. While a 1981 trial of Presley's main physician, George C. Nichopoulos, exonerated him of criminal liability for his death, the facts were startling: "In the first eight months of 1977 alone, he had [prescribed] more than 10,000 doses of sedatives, amphetamines, and narcotics: all in Elvis' name." His license was suspended for three months. It was permanently revoked in the 1990s after the Tennessee Medical Board brought new charges of over-prescription.

In 1994, the Presley autopsy report was reopened. Joseph Davis, who had conducted thousands of autopsies as Miami-Dade County coroner, declared at its completion, "There is nothing in any of the data that supports a death from drugs. In fact, everything points to a sudden, violent heart attack." More recent research has revealed that Francisco did not speak for the entire pathology team. Other staff "could say nothing with confidence until they got the results back from the laboratories, if then. That would be a matter of weeks." One of the examiners, E. Eric Muirhead, "could not believe his ears. Francisco had not only presumed to speak for the hospital's team of pathologists, he had announced a conclusion that they had not reached. ... Early on, a meticulous dissection of the body ... confirmed [that] Elvis was chronically ill with diabetes, glaucoma, and constipation. As they proceeded, the doctors saw evidence that his body had been wracked over a span of years by a large and constant stream of drugs. They had also studied his hospital records, which included two admissions for drug detoxification and methadone treatments." Writer Frank Coffey thought Presley's death was due to "a phenomenon called the Valsalva maneuver (essentially straining on the toilet leading to heart stoppage—plausible because Elvis suffered constipation, a common reaction to drug use)". In similar terms, Dan Warlick, who was present at the autopsy, "believes Presley's chronic constipation—the result of years of prescription drug abuse and high-fat, high-cholesterol gorging—brought on what's known as Valsalva's maneuver. Put simply, the strain of attempting to defecate compressed the singer's abdominal aorta, shutting down his heart."

However, in 2013, Forest Tennant, who had testified as a defense witness in Nichopoulos' trial, described his own analysis of Presley's available medical records. He concluded that Presley's "drug abuse had led to falls, head trauma, and overdoses that damaged his brain", and that his death was due in part to a toxic reaction to codeine—exacerbated by an undetected liver enzyme defect—which can cause sudden cardiac arrhythmia. DNA analysis in 2014 of a hair sample, purported to be Presley's, found evidence of genetic variants that can lead to glaucoma, migraines, and obesity; a crucial variant associated with the heart muscle disease hypertrophic cardiomyopathy was also identified.

Later developments 
Between 1977 and 1981, six of Presley's posthumously released singles were top-ten country hits. Presley's home, Graceland, was opened to the public in 1982. Attracting over half a million visitors annually, it became the second-most-visited home in the United States, after the White House. It was declared a National Historic Landmark in 2006.

Presley has been inducted into five music halls of fame: the Rock and Roll Hall of Fame (1986), the Country Music Hall of Fame (1998), the Gospel Music Hall of Fame (2001), the Rockabilly Hall of Fame (2007), and the Memphis Music Hall of Fame (2012). In 1984, he received the W. C. Handy Award from the Blues Foundation and the Academy of Country Music's first Golden Hat Award. In 1987, he received the American Music Awards' Award of Merit.

A Junkie XL remix of Presley's "A Little Less Conversation" (credited as "Elvis Vs JXL") was used in a Nike advertising campaign during the 2002 FIFA World Cup. It topped the charts in over 20 countries and was included in a compilation of Presley's number-one hits, ELV1S, which was also an international success. The album returned Presley to the Billboard summit for the first time in almost three decades.

In 2003, a remix of "Rubberneckin'", a 1969 recording of Presley's, topped the US sales chart, as did a 50th-anniversary re-release of "That's All Right" the following year. The latter was an outright hit in Britain, debuting at number three on the pop chart; it also made the top ten in Canada. In 2005, another three reissued singles, "Jailhouse Rock", "One Night"/"I Got Stung", and "It's Now or Never", went to number one in the United Kingdom. They were part of a campaign that saw the re-release of all 18 of Presley's previous chart-topping UK singles. The first, "All Shook Up", came with a collectors' box that made it ineligible to chart again; each of the other 17 reissues hit the British top five.

In 2005, Forbes named Presley the top-earning deceased celebrity for the fifth straight year, with a gross income of $45 million. He was placed second in 2006, returned to the top spot the next two years, and ranked fourth in 2009. The following year, he was ranked second, with his highest annual income ever—$60 million—spurred by the celebration of his 75th birthday and the launch of Cirque du Soleil's Viva Elvis show in Las Vegas. In November 2010, Viva Elvis: The Album was released, setting his voice to newly recorded instrumental tracks. As of mid-2011, there were an estimated 15,000 licensed Presley products, and he was again the second-highest-earning deceased celebrity. Six years later, he ranked fourth with earnings of $35 million, up $8 million from 2016 due in part to the opening of a new entertainment complex, Elvis Presley's Memphis, and hotel, The Guest House at Graceland.

In 2018, RCA/Legacy released Elvis Presley – Where No One Stands Alone, a new album focused on Elvis's love of gospel music. Produced by Joel Weinshanker, Lisa Marie Presley and Andy Childs, the album introduced newly recorded instrumentation along with vocals from singers who had performed in the past with Elvis. It also included a reimagined duet with Lisa Marie, on the album's title track.

In 2022, Baz Luhrmann's film Elvis, a biopic about Presley's life, was released in theaters. Presley is portrayed by Austin Butler and Colonel Tom Parker by Tom Hanks. As of August 2022, the film had grossed $261.8 million worldwide on a $85 million budget, becoming the second-highest-grossing music biopic of all-time behind Bohemian Rhapsody (2018), and the fifth-highest-grossing Australian-produced film. For his portrayal of Elvis, Butler won the Golden Globe and was nominated for the Oscar for Best Actor. In January 2023, on what would have been Presley’s 88th birthday, his 1962 Lockheed 1329 JetStar sold at an auction for $260,000. The plane sold at the Mecum Kissimmee Collector Car auction in Florida.

Artistry

Influences 
Presley's earliest musical influence came from gospel. His mother recalled that from the age of two, at the Assembly of God church in Tupelo attended by the family, "he would slide down off my lap, run into the aisle and scramble up to the platform. There he would stand looking at the choir and trying to sing with them." In Memphis, Presley frequently attended all-night gospel singings at the Ellis Auditorium, where groups such as the Statesmen Quartet led the music in a style that, Guralnick suggests, sowed the seeds of Presley's future stage act:

As a teenager, Presley's musical interests were wide-ranging, and he was deeply informed about both white and African-American musical idioms. Though he never had any formal training, he had a remarkable memory, and his musical knowledge was already considerable by the time he made his first professional recordings aged 19 in 1954. When Jerry Leiber and Mike Stoller met him two years later, they were astonished at his encyclopedic understanding of the blues, and, as Stoller put it, "He certainly knew a lot more than we did about country music and gospel music." At a press conference the following year, he proudly declared, "I know practically every religious song that's ever been written."

Musicianship 
Presley played guitar, bass, and piano; he received his first guitar when he was 11 years old. He could not read or write music and had no formal lessons, and played everything by ear. Presley often played an instrument on his recordings and produced his own music. Presley played rhythm acoustic guitar on most of his Sun recordings and his 1950s RCA albums. He played electric bass guitar on "(You're So Square) Baby I Don't Care" after his bassist Bill Black had trouble with the instrument. Presley played the bass line including the intro. Presley played piano on songs such as "Old Shep" and "First in Line" from his 1956 album Elvis. He is credited with playing piano on later albums such as From Elvis in Memphis and "Moody Blue", and on "Unchained Melody", which was one of the last songs that he recorded. Presley played lead guitar on one of his successful singles called "Are You Lonesome Tonight". In the 68 Comeback Special, Elvis took over on lead electric guitar, the first time he had ever been seen with the instrument in public, playing it on songs such as "Baby What You Want Me to Do" and "One Night". Presley played the back of his guitar on some of his hits such as "All Shook Up", "Don't Be Cruel", and "(Let Me Be Your) Teddy Bear", providing percussion by slapping the instrument to create a beat. The album Elvis is Back! features Presley playing a lot of acoustic guitar on songs such as "I Will Be Home Again" and "Like a Baby".

Musical styles and genres 

Presley was a central figure in the development of rockabilly, according to music historians. "Rockabilly crystallized into a recognizable style in 1954 with Elvis Presley's first release, on the Sun label," writes Craig Morrison. Paul Friedlander described rockabilly as "essentially ... an Elvis Presley construction", with the defining elements as "the raw, emotive, and slurred vocal style and emphasis on rhythmic feeling [of] the blues with the string band and strummed rhythm guitar [of] country". In "That's All Right", the Presley trio's first record, Scotty Moore's guitar solo, "a combination of Merle Travis–style country finger-picking, double-stop slides from acoustic boogie, and blues-based bent-note, single-string work, is a microcosm of this fusion". While Katherine Charlton calls Presley "rockabilly's originator", Presley's guitarist Carl Perkins said that "[Sam] Phillips, Elvis, and I didn't create rockabilly"; according to Michael Campbell, the first major rockabilly song was recorded by Bill Haley. In Moore's view, "It had been there for quite a while, really. Carl Perkins was doing basically the same sort of thing up around Jackson, and I know for a fact Jerry Lee Lewis had been playing that kind of music ever since he was ten years old."

At RCA Victor, Presley's rock and roll sound grew distinct from rockabilly with group chorus vocals, more heavily amplified electric guitars and a tougher, more intense manner. While he was known for taking songs from various sources and giving them a rockabilly/rock and roll treatment, he also recorded songs in other genres from early in his career, from the pop standard "Blue Moon" at Sun Records to the country ballad "How's the World Treating You?" on his second RCA Victor LP to the blues of "Santa Claus Is Back in Town". In 1957, his first gospel record was released, the four-song EP Peace in the Valley. Certified as a million-seller, it became the top-selling gospel EP in recording history. Presley would record gospel periodically for the rest of his life.

After his return from military service in 1960, Presley continued to perform rock and roll, but the characteristic style was substantially toned down. His first post-Army single, the number-one hit "Stuck on You", is typical of this shift. RCA Victor publicity referred to its "mild rock beat"; discographer Ernst Jorgensen calls it "upbeat pop". The number five "She's Not You" (1962) "integrates the Jordanaires so completely, it's practically doo-wop". The modern blues/R&B sound captured with success on Elvis Is Back! was essentially abandoned for six years until such 1966–67 recordings as "Down in the Alley" and "Hi-Heel Sneakers". Presley's output during most of the 1960s emphasized pop music, often in the form of ballads such as "Are You Lonesome Tonight?", a number-one in 1960. "It's Now or Never", which also topped the chart that year, was a classically influenced variation of pop based on the Neapolitan song "'O sole mio" and concluding with a "full-voiced operatic cadence". These were both dramatic numbers, but most of what Presley recorded for his many film soundtracks was in a much lighter vein.

While Presley performed several of his classic ballads for the '68 Comeback Special, the sound of the show was dominated by aggressive rock and roll. He recorded few new straight rock and roll songs thereafter; as he explained, they had become "hard to find". A significant exception was "Burning Love", his last major hit on the pop charts. Like his work of the 1950s, Presley's subsequent recordings reworked pop and country songs, but in markedly different permutations. His stylistic range now began to embrace a more contemporary rock sound as well as soul and funk. Much of Elvis in Memphis, as well as "Suspicious Minds", cut at the same sessions, reflected this new rock and soul fusion. In the mid-1970s, many of his singles found a home on country radio, the field where he first became a star.

Vocal style and range 

The developmental arc of Presley's singing voice, as described by critic Dave Marsh, goes from "high and thrilled in the early days, [to] lower and perplexed in the final months." Marsh credits Presley with the introduction of the "vocal stutter" on 1955's "Baby Let's Play House". When on "Don't Be Cruel", Presley "slides into a 'mmmmm' that marks the transition between the first two verses," he shows "how masterful his relaxed style really is." Marsh describes the vocal performance on "Can't Help Falling in Love" as one of "gentle insistence and delicacy of phrasing", with the line Shall I stay' pronounced as if the words are fragile as crystal".

Jorgensen calls the 1966 recording of "How Great Thou Art" "an extraordinary fulfillment of his vocal ambitions", as Presley "crafted for himself an ad-hoc arrangement in which he took every part of the four-part vocal, from [the] bass intro to the soaring heights of the song's operatic climax", becoming "a kind of one-man quartet". Guralnick finds "Stand by Me" from the same gospel sessions "a beautifully articulated, almost nakedly yearning performance," but, by contrast, feels that Presley reaches beyond his powers on "Where No One Stands Alone", resorting "to a kind of inelegant bellowing to push out a sound" that Jake Hess of the Statesmen Quartet had in his command. Hess himself thought that while others might have voices the equal of Presley's, "he had that certain something that everyone searches for all during their lifetime." Guralnick attempts to pinpoint that something: "The warmth of his voice, his controlled use of both vibrato technique and natural falsetto range, the subtlety and deeply felt conviction of his singing were all qualities recognizably belonging to his talent but just as recognizably not to be achieved without sustained dedication and effort."

Marsh praises his 1968 reading of "U.S. Male", "bearing down on the hard guy lyrics, not sending them up or overplaying them but tossing them around with that astonishingly tough yet gentle assurance that he brought to his Sun records." The performance on "In the Ghetto" is, according to Jorgensen, "devoid of any of his characteristic vocal tricks or mannerisms", instead relying on the exceptional "clarity and sensitivity of his voice". Guralnick describes the song's delivery as of "almost translucent eloquence ... so quietly confident in its simplicity". On "Suspicious Minds", Guralnick hears essentially the same "remarkable mixture of tenderness and poise", but supplemented with "an expressive quality somewhere between stoicism (at suspected infidelity) and anguish (over impending loss)".

Music critic Henry Pleasants observes that "Presley has been described variously as a baritone and a tenor. An extraordinary compass ... and a very wide range of vocal color have something to do with this divergence of opinion." He identifies Presley as a high baritone, calculating his range as two octaves and a third, "from the baritone low G to the tenor high B, with an upward extension in falsetto to at least a D-flat. Presley's best octave is in the middle, D-flat to D-flat, granting an extra full step up or down." In Pleasants' view, his voice was "variable and unpredictable" at the bottom, "often brilliant" at the top, with the capacity for "full-voiced high Gs and As that an opera baritone might envy". Scholar Lindsay Waters, who figures Presley's range as two-and-a-quarter octaves, emphasizes that "his voice had an emotional range from tender whispers to sighs down to shouts, grunts, grumbles, and sheer gruffness that could move the listener from calmness and surrender, to fear. His voice can not be measured in octaves, but in decibels; even that misses the problem of how to measure delicate whispers that are hardly audible at all." Presley was always "able to duplicate the open, hoarse, ecstatic, screaming, shouting, wailing, reckless sound of the black rhythm-and-blues and gospel singers", writes Pleasants, and also demonstrated a remarkable ability to assimilate many other vocal styles.

Public image

Relationship with the African-American community 
When Dewey Phillips first aired "That's All Right" on Memphis' WHBQ, many listeners who contacted the station by phone and telegram to ask for it again assumed that its singer was black. From the beginning of his national fame, Presley expressed respect for African-American performers and their music, and disregard for the norms of segregation and racial prejudice then prevalent in the South. Interviewed in 1956, he recalled how in his childhood he would listen to blues musician Arthur Crudup—the originator of "That's All Right"—"bang his box the way I do now, and I said if I ever got to the place where I could feel all old Arthur felt, I'd be a music man like nobody ever saw." The Memphis World, an African-American newspaper, reported that Presley, "the rock 'n' roll phenomenon", "cracked Memphis' segregation laws" by attending the local amusement park on what was designated as its "colored night". Such statements and actions led Presley to be generally hailed in the black community during the early days of his stardom. In contrast, many white adults "did not like him, and condemned him as depraved. Anti-negro prejudice doubtless figured in adult antagonism. Regardless of whether parents were aware of the Negro sexual origins of the phrase 'rock 'n' roll', Presley impressed them as the visual and aural embodiment of sex."

Despite the largely positive view of Presley held by African Americans, a rumor spread in mid-1957 that he had at some point announced, "The only thing Negroes can do for me is buy my records and shine my shoes." A journalist with the national African-American weekly Jet, Louie Robinson, pursued the story. On the set of Jailhouse Rock, Presley granted Robinson an interview, though he was no longer dealing with the mainstream press. He denied making such a statement: "I never said anything like that, and people who know me know that I wouldn't have said it. ... A lot of people seem to think I started this business. But rock 'n' roll was here a long time before I came along. Nobody can sing that kind of music like colored people. Let's face it: I can't sing like Fats Domino can. I know that." Robinson found no evidence that the remark had ever been made, and on the contrary elicited testimony from many individuals indicating that Presley was anything but racist. Blues singer Ivory Joe Hunter, who had heard the rumor before he visited Graceland one evening, reported of Presley, "He showed me every courtesy, and I think he's one of the greatest." Though the rumored remark was discredited, it was still being used against Presley decades later. 

The identification of Presley with racism—either personally or symbolically—was expressed in the lyrics of the 1989 rap hit "Fight the Power", by Public Enemy: "Elvis was a hero to most / But he never meant shit to me / Straight-up racist that sucker was / Simple and plain / Motherfuck him and John Wayne". In an interview with Newsday timed with the 25th anniversary of Presley's death, the Public Enemy member Chuck D, the author of the line, acknowledged that Presley was held in esteem by black musicians and that Presley had admired black musicians. Chuck D said that he had intended to attack white culture which hailed Presley as a "king" without acknowledging the black artists before him.

The persistence of such attitudes was fueled by resentment over the fact that Presley, whose musical and visual performance idiom owed much to African-American sources, achieved the cultural acknowledgement and commercial success largely denied his black peers. Into the 21st century, the notion that Presley had "stolen" black music still found adherents. Notable among African-American entertainers expressly rejecting this view was Jackie Wilson, who argued, "A lot of people have accused Elvis of stealing the black man's music, when in fact, almost every black solo entertainer copied his stage mannerisms from Elvis." Moreover, Presley also acknowledged his debt to African-American musicians throughout his career. Addressing his '68 Comeback Special audience, he said, "Rock 'n' roll music is basically gospel or rhythm and blues, or it sprang from that. People have been adding to it, adding instruments to it, experimenting with it, but it all boils down to [that]." Nine years earlier, he had said, "Rock 'n' roll has been around for many years. It used to be called rhythm and blues."

Sex symbol 

Presley's physical attractiveness and sexual appeal were widely acknowledged. "He was once beautiful, astonishingly beautiful", according to critic Mark Feeney. Television director Steve Binder, no fan of Presley's music before he oversaw the 1968 Comeback Special, reported, "I'm straight as an arrow and I got to tell you, you stop, whether you're male or female, to look at him. He was that good looking. And if you never knew he was a superstar, it wouldn't make any difference; if he'd walked in the room, you'd know somebody special was in your presence." His performance style, as much as his physical beauty, was responsible for Presley's eroticized image. Writing in 1970, critic George Melly described him as "the master of the sexual simile, treating his guitar as both phallus and girl". In his Presley obituary, Lester Bangs credited him as "the man who brought overt blatant vulgar sexual frenzy to the popular arts in America". Ed Sullivan's declaration that he perceived a soda bottle in Presley's trousers was echoed by rumors involving a similarly positioned toilet roll tube or lead bar.

While Presley was marketed as an icon of heterosexuality, some cultural critics have argued that his image was ambiguous. In 1959, Sight and Sounds Peter John Dyer described his onscreen persona as "aggressively bisexual in appeal". Brett Farmer places the "orgasmic gyrations" of the title dance sequence in Jailhouse Rock within a lineage of cinematic musical numbers that offer a "spectacular eroticization, if not homoeroticization, of the male image". In the analysis of Yvonne Tasker, "Elvis was an ambivalent figure who articulated a peculiar feminised, objectifying version of white working-class masculinity as aggressive sexual display."

Reinforcing Presley's image as a sex symbol were the reports of his dalliances with various Hollywood stars and starlets, from Natalie Wood in the 1950s to Connie Stevens and Ann-Margret in the 1960s to Candice Bergen and Cybill Shepherd in the 1970s. June Juanico of Memphis, one of Presley's early girlfriends, later blamed Parker for encouraging him to choose his dating partners with publicity in mind. Presley never grew comfortable with the Hollywood scene, and most of these relationships were insubstantial.

Equestrian 
Elvis kept several horses at Graceland, and horses remain important to the Graceland estate. A local former teacher, Alene Alexander, has taken care of the horses at Graceland for 38 years. She and Priscilla Presley have a love for horses and have formed a special friendship. It was because of Priscilla that Elvis brought horses to Graceland. "He got me my first horse as a Christmas present – Domino," said Priscilla Presley. Alexander now serves as Graceland's Ambassador. She is one of three of the original staff members still working at the estate.

The horse named Palomino Rising Sun was Elvis' favorite horse, and there are many photographs of him riding him.

Associates

Colonel Parker and the Aberbachs 

Once he became Presley's manager, Colonel Tom Parker insisted on exceptionally tight control over his client's career. Early on, he and his Hill and Range allies, the brothers Jean and Julian Aberbach, perceived the close relationship that developed between Presley and songwriters Jerry Leiber and Mike Stoller as a serious threat to that control. Parker effectively ended the relationship, deliberately or not, with the new contract he sent Leiber in early 1958. Leiber thought there was a mistake—the sheet of paper was blank except for Parker's signature and a line on which to enter his. "There's no mistake, boy, just sign it and return it", Parker directed. "Don't worry, we'll fill it in later." Leiber declined, and Presley's fruitful collaboration with the writing team was over. Other respected songwriters lost interest in or simply avoided writing for Presley because of the requirement that they surrender a third of their usual royalties.

By 1967, Parker's contracts gave him 50 percent of most of Presley's earnings from recordings, films, and merchandise. Beginning in February 1972, he took a third of the profit from live appearances; a January 1976 agreement entitled him to half of that as well. Priscilla Presley noted that "Elvis detested the business side of his career. He would sign a contract without even reading it." Presley's friend Marty Lacker regarded Parker as a "hustler and a con artist. He was only interested in 'now money'—get the buck and get gone." Priscilla Presley said after Parker's death, however, that Elvis was happy to pay 50% to Parker to manage him.

Lacker was instrumental in convincing Presley to record with Memphis producer Chips Moman and his handpicked musicians at American Sound Studio in early 1969. The American Sound sessions represented a significant departure from the control customarily exerted by Hill and Range. Moman still had to deal with the publisher's staff on-site, whose song suggestions he regarded as unacceptable. He was on the verge of quitting until Presley ordered the Hill and Range personnel out of the studio. Although RCA executive Joan Deary was later full of praise for the producer's song choices and the quality of the recordings, Moman, to his fury, received neither credit on the records nor royalties for his work.

Throughout his entire career, Presley performed in only three venues outside the United States—all of them in Canada, during brief tours there in 1957. In 1968, he remarked, "Before too long I'm going to make some personal appearance tours. I'll probably start out here in this country and after that, play some concerts abroad, probably starting in Europe. I want to see some places I've never seen before." Rumors that he would play overseas for the first time were fueled in 1974 by a million-dollar bid for an Australian tour. Parker was uncharacteristically reluctant, prompting those close to Presley to speculate about the manager's past and the reasons for his evident unwillingness to apply for a passport. After Presley's death, it was revealed that Parker was born Andreas Cornelis van Kuijk in the Netherlands; having immigrated illegally to the US, he supposedly had reason to fear that if he left the country, he would not be allowed back in again. Parker ultimately rejected any notions Presley had of working abroad, claiming that foreign security was poor and the venues unsuitable for a star of his magnitude.

Parker arguably exercised tightest control over Presley's film career. Hal Wallis said, "I'd rather try and close a deal with the devil" than with Parker. Fellow film producer Sam Katzman described him as "the biggest con artist in the world". In 1957, Robert Mitchum asked Presley to costar with him in Thunder Road, which Mitchum was producing and writing. According to George Klein, one of his oldest friends, Presley was also offered starring roles in West Side Story and Midnight Cowboy. In 1974, Barbra Streisand approached Presley to star with her in the remake of A Star is Born. In each case, any ambitions Presley may have had to play such parts were thwarted by his manager's negotiating demands or flat refusals. In Lacker's description, "The only thing that kept Elvis going after the early years was a new challenge. But Parker kept running everything into the ground." The prevailing attitude may have been summed up best by the response Leiber and Stoller received when they brought a serious film project for Presley to Parker and the Hill and Range owners for their consideration. In Leiber's telling, Jean Aberbach warned them to never again "try to interfere with the business or artistic workings of the process known as Elvis Presley".

Memphis Mafia 

In the early 1960s, the circle of friends with whom Presley constantly surrounded himself until his death came to be known as the "Memphis Mafia". "Surrounded by the[ir] parasitic presence", as journalist John Harris puts it, "it was no wonder that as he slid into addiction and torpor, no-one raised the alarm: to them, Elvis was the bank, and it had to remain open." Tony Brown, who played piano for Presley regularly in the last two years of Presley's life, observed his rapidly declining health and the urgent need to address it: "But we all knew it was hopeless because Elvis was surrounded by that little circle of people ... all those so-called friends". In the Memphis Mafia's defense, Marty Lacker has said, "[Presley] was his own man. ... If we hadn't been around, he would have been dead a lot earlier."

Larry Geller became Presley's hairdresser in 1964. Unlike others in the Memphis Mafia, he was interested in spiritual questions and recalls how, from their first conversation, Presley revealed his secret thoughts and anxieties: "I mean there has to be a purpose ... there's got to be a reason ... why I was chosen to be Elvis Presley. ... I swear to God, no one knows how lonely I get. And how empty I really feel." Thereafter, Geller supplied him with books on religion and mysticism, which Presley read voraciously. Presley would be preoccupied by such matters for much of his life, taking trunkloads of books on tour.

Legacy 

Presley's rise to national attention in 1956 transformed the field of popular music and had a huge effect on the broader scope of popular culture. As the catalyst for the cultural revolution that was rock and roll, he was central not only to defining it as a musical genre but in making it a touchstone of youth culture and rebellious attitude. With its racially mixed origins—repeatedly affirmed by Presley—rock and roll's occupation of a central position in mainstream American culture facilitated a new acceptance and appreciation of black culture.

In this regard, Little Richard said of Presley, "He was an integrator. Elvis was a blessing. They wouldn't let black music through. He opened the door for black music." Al Green agreed: "He broke the ice for all of us."

President Jimmy Carter remarked on Presley's legacy in 1977: "His music and his personality, fusing the styles of white country and black rhythm and blues, permanently changed the face of American popular culture. His following was immense, and he was a symbol to people the world over of the vitality, rebelliousness, and good humor of his country." Presley also heralded the vastly expanded reach of celebrity in the era of mass communication: at the age of 21, within a year of his first appearance on American network television, he was regarded as one of the most famous people in the world.

Presley's name, image, and voice are recognized around the world. He has inspired a legion of impersonators. In polls and surveys, he is recognized as one of the most important popular music artists and influential Americans. American composer and conductor Leonard Bernstein said, "Elvis Presley is the greatest cultural force in the twentieth century. He introduced the beat to everything and he changed everything—music, language, clothes. It's a whole new social revolution—the sixties came from it." John Lennon said that "Nothing really affected me until Elvis." Bob Dylan described the sensation of first hearing Presley as "like busting out of jail".

For much of his adult life, Presley, with his rise from poverty to riches and fame, had seemed to epitomize the American Dream. In his final years, and following the revelations about his circumstances after his death, he became a symbol of excess and gluttony. Increasing attention was paid to his appetite for the rich, heavy Southern cooking of his upbringing, foods such as chicken-fried steak and biscuits and gravy. In particular, his love of fried peanut butter, banana, and (sometimes) bacon sandwiches, now known as "Elvis sandwiches", came to symbolize this characteristic. According to the media scholar Robert Thompson, the sandwich also signified Presley's enduring all-American appeal: "He wasn't only the king, he was one of us."

Since 1977, there have been numerous alleged sightings of Presley. A long-standing conspiracy theory among some fans is that he faked his death. Adherents cite alleged discrepancies in the death certificate, reports of a wax dummy in his original coffin, and accounts of Presley planning a diversion so he could retire in peace. An unusually large number of fans have domestic shrines devoted to Presley and journey to sites with which he is connected, however faintly. Every August 16, the anniversary of his death, thousands of people gather outside Graceland and celebrate his memory with a candlelight ritual. "With Elvis, it is not just his music that has survived death", writes Ted Harrison. "He himself has been raised, like a medieval saint, to a figure of cultic status. It is as if he has been canonized by acclamation."

On the 25th anniversary of Presley's death, The New York Times asserted, "All the talentless impersonators and appalling black velvet paintings on display can make him seem little more than a perverse and distant memory. But before Elvis was camp, he was its opposite: a genuine cultural force. ... Elvis' breakthroughs are underappreciated because in this rock-and-roll age, his hard-rocking music and sultry style have triumphed so completely." Not only Presley's achievements but his failings as well, are seen by some cultural observers as adding to the power of his legacy, as in this description by Greil Marcus:

Elvis Presley is a supreme figure in American life, one whose presence, no matter how banal or predictable, brooks no real comparisons. ... The cultural range of his music has expanded to the point where it includes not only the hits of the day, but also patriotic recitals, pure country gospel, and really dirty blues. ... Elvis has emerged as a great artist, a great rocker, a great purveyor of schlock, a great heart throb, a great bore, a great symbol of potency, a great ham, a great nice person, and, yes, a great American.

Achievements 
Having sold about 500 million records worldwide, Presley is one of the best-selling music artists of all time.

Presley holds the records for most songs charting in Billboards top 40 (115) and top 100 (152), according to chart statistician Joel Whitburn, 139 according to Presley historian Adam Victor. Presley's rankings for top ten and number-one hits vary depending on how the double-sided "Hound Dog/Don't Be Cruel" and "Don't/I Beg of You" singles, which precede the inception of Billboards unified Hot 100 chart, are analyzed. According to Whitburn's analysis, Presley holds the record with 38, tying with Madonna; per Billboards current assessment, he ranks second with 36. Whitburn and Billboard concur that the Beatles hold the record for most number-one hits with 20, and that Mariah Carey is second with 19. Whitburn has Presley with 18: Billboard has him third with 17. According to Billboard,  Presley has 79 cumulative weeks at number one: alone at 80, according to Whitburn and the Rock and Roll Hall of Fame, with only Mariah Carey having more with 91 weeks. He holds the records for most number-one singles on the UK chart with 21 and singles reaching the top ten with 76.

As an album artist, Presley is credited by Billboard with the record for the most albums charting in the Billboard 200: 129, far ahead of second-place Frank Sinatra's 82. He also holds the record for most time spent at number one on the Billboard 200: 67 weeks. In 2015 and 2016, two albums setting Presley's vocals against music by the Royal Philharmonic Orchestra, If I Can Dream and The Wonder of You, both reached number one in the United Kingdom. This gave him a new record for number-one UK albums by a solo artist with 13, and extended his record for longest span between number-one albums by anybody—Presley had first topped the British chart in 1956 with his self-titled debut.

, the Recording Industry Association of America (RIAA) credits Presley with 146.5 million certified album sales in the US, third all time behind the Beatles and Garth Brooks. He holds the records for most gold albums (101, nearly twice as many as second-place Barbra Streisand's 51), and most platinum albums (57). His 25 multi-platinum albums is second behind the Beatles' 26. His total of 197 album certification awards (including one diamond award), far outpaces the Beatles' second-best 122. He has the 9th-most gold singles (54, tied with Justin Bieber), and the 16th-most platinum singles (27).

In 2012, the spider Paradonea presleyi was named in his honor. In 2018, President Donald Trump awarded Presley the Presidential Medal of Freedom posthumously.

Bands

Presley worked with many bands and studio musicians over the course of his career. The following is a list and timeline of the most prominent musicians that worked with Presley during his lifetime.

 Scotty Moore — lead guitar, rhythm guitar, backing vocals (1954–59, 1960–69; died 2016)
 Bill Black — double bass, bass guitar, backing vocals (1954–58; died 1965)
 DJ Fontana — drums, backing vocals (1955–59, 1960–69; died 2018)
 Gordon Stoker — backing vocals, piano, organ, accordion, percussion (1956–59, 1960–68, 1969–71; died 2013)
 Neal Matthews, Jr. — backing vocals, guitar, bass guitar, double bass (1956–59, 1960–68, 1969–71; died 2000)
 Hoyt Hawkins — backing vocals, piano, organ, percussion (1956–59, 1960–68, 1969–71; died 1980)
 Hugh Jarrett — backing vocals (1956–58; died 2008)
 Ray Walker — backing vocals (1958–59, 1960–68, 1969–71)
 Bob Moore — double bass, bass guitar (1958–59, 1960–68; died 2021)
 Dudley Brooks — piano, celeste (1957–59, 1960–63; died 1989)
 Tiny Timbrell — rhythm and lead guitars, mandolin (1958–59, 1963–68; died 1992)
 Hank Garland — lead guitar, bass guitar (1960–61; died 2004)
 Floyd Cramer — piano, organ (1960, 1963–68; died 1997)
 Boots Randolph — saxophone, vibraphone, percussion (1960–62, 1964–68; died 2007)
 Buddy Harman — drums, percussion (1960–63, 1964–68; died 2008)
 Clifford Scott — saxophone (1962–64; died 1993)
 Tony Terran — trumpet (1963-1968, 1971–1972; died 2017)
 Hal Blaine — drums, percussion (1963; died 2019)
 Charlie Hodge — rhythm guitar, harmony and backing vocals (1967–77; died 2006)
 Reggie Young – lead guitar (1969; died 2019)
 Mike Leech – bass guitar (1969)
 Tommy Cogbill – bass guitar (1969)
 Bobby Wood – piano (1969)
 Bobby Emmons – electric piano, organ (1969)
 Gene Chrisman – drums (1969)
 James Burton — lead guitar (1969–77)
 John Wilkinson — rhythm guitar (1969–77; died 2013)
 Jerry Scheff — bass guitar (1969–73, 1975–77)
 Ronnie Tutt — drums (1969, 1970–77; died 2021)
 Larry Muhoberac — piano, electric piano (1969; died 2016)
 Bob Lanning — drums (1970)
 Glen D. Hardin — piano (1970–76)
 Emory Gordy, Jr — bass guitar (1973)
 Duke Bardwell — bass guitar (1973–75)
 David Briggs — electric piano, clavinet, piano, organ (1975–77)
 Tony Brown — piano, organ (1976–77)
 Bobby Ogdin — electric piano, clavinet, piano (1977)

Discography 

A vast number of recordings have been issued under Presley's name. The total number of his original master recordings has been variously calculated as 665 and 711. His career began and he was most successful during an era when singles were the primary commercial medium for pop music. In the case of his albums, the distinction between "official" studio records and other forms is often blurred. For most of the 1960s, his recording career focused on soundtrack albums. In the 1970s, his most heavily promoted and bestselling LP releases tended to be concert albums.

Studio albums
 Elvis Presley (1956)
 Elvis (1956)
 Elvis' Christmas Album (1957)
 Elvis Is Back! (1960)
 His Hand in Mine (1960)
 Something for Everybody (1961)
 Pot Luck (1962)
 Elvis for Everyone! (1965)
 How Great Thou Art (1967)
 From Elvis in Memphis (1969)
 From Memphis to Vegas / From Vegas to Memphis (1969)
 That's the Way It Is (1970)
 Elvis Country (I'm 10,000 Years Old) (1971)
 Love Letters from Elvis (1971)
 Elvis sings The Wonderful World of Christmas (1971)
 Elvis Now (1972)
 He Touched Me (1972)
 Elvis (1973) (The "Fool" Album)
 Raised on Rock / For Ol' Times Sake (1973)
 Good Times (1974)
 Promised Land (1975)
 Today (1975)
 From Elvis Presley Boulevard, Memphis, Tennessee (1976)
 Moody Blue (1977)

Soundtrack albums (original material)
 Loving You (1957)
 King Creole (1958)
 G.I. Blues (1960)
 Blue Hawaii (1961)
 Girls! Girls! Girls! (1962)
 It Happened at the World's Fair (1963)
 Fun in Acapulco (1963)
 Kissin' Cousins (1964)
 Roustabout (1964)
 Girl Happy (1965)
 Harum Scarum (1965)
 Frankie and Johnny (1966)
 Paradise, Hawaiian Style (1966)
 Spinout (1966)
 Double Trouble (1967)
 Clambake (1967)
 Speedway (1968)

Filmography 

 Films starred

 Love Me Tender (1956)
 Loving You (1957)
 Jailhouse Rock (1957)
 King Creole (1958)
 G.I. Blues (1960)
 Flaming Star (1960)
 Wild in the Country (1961)
 Blue Hawaii (1961)
 Follow That Dream (1962)
 Kid Galahad (1962)
 Girls! Girls! Girls! (1962)
 It Happened at the World's Fair (1963)
 Fun in Acapulco (1963)
 Kissin' Cousins (1964)
 Viva Las Vegas (1964)
 Roustabout (1964)
 Girl Happy (1965)
 Tickle Me (1965)
 Harum Scarum (1965)
 Frankie and Johnny (1966)
 Paradise, Hawaiian Style (1966)
 Spinout (1966)
 Easy Come, Easy Go (1967)
 Double Trouble (1967)
 Clambake (1967)
 Stay Away, Joe (1968)
 Speedway (1968)
 Live a Little, Love a Little (1968)
 Charro! (1969)
 The Trouble with Girls (1969)
 Change of Habit (1969)
 Elvis: That's the Way It Is (1970)
 Elvis on Tour (1972)

 TV concert specials
 Elvis (1968)
 Aloha from Hawaii via Satellite (1973)
 Elvis in Concert (1977)

See also 

 Elvis Presley Enterprises
 Honorific nicknames in popular music
 List of artists by number of UK Albums Chart number ones
 List of artists by number of UK Singles Chart number ones
 List of bestselling music artists
 Personal relationships of Elvis Presley

Explanatory notes

References

Citations

General sources 

 
 
 
 
 
 
 
 
 
 
 
 
 
 
 
 
 
 
 
 
 
 
 
 
 
 
 
 
 
 
 
 
 
 
 
 
 
 
 
 
 
 
 
 
 
 
 
 
 
 
 
 
 
 
 
 
 
 
 
 
 
 
 
 
 
 
 
 
 
 
 
 
 
 
 
 
 
 
 
 
 
 
 
 
 
 
 
 
 
 
 
 
 
 
 
 
 
 
 
 
 
 
 
 
 
 
 
 
 
 
 
 
 
 
 
 
 
 
 
 
 
 
 
 
 
 
 
 
 
 
 
 
 
 
 
 
 
 
 
 
 
 
 
 
 
 
 
 
 
 
 
 
 
 
 
 
 
 
 
 
 
 
 
 
  
 
 
 
 
 
 
 
 
 
 
 
  Via

Further reading 

 Allen, Lew (2007). Elvis and the Birth of Rock. Genesis. .
 
 
 
 Cantor, Louis (2005). Dewey and Elvis: The Life and Times of a Rock 'n' Roll Deejay. University of Illinois Press. .
 
 Dickerson, James L. (2001). Colonel Tom Parker: The Curious Life of Elvis Presley's Eccentric Manager. Cooper Square Press. .
 
 Goldman, Albert (1981). Elvis. McGraw-Hill. .
 Goldman, Albert (1990). Elvis: The Last 24 Hours. St. Martin's. .
 Klein, George (2010). Elvis: My Best Man: Radio Days, Rock 'n' Roll Nights, and My Lifelong Friendship with Elvis Presley. Virgin Books. 
 Marcus, Greil (1991). Dead Elvis: A Chronicle of a Cultural Obsession. Doubleday. .
 Marcus, Greil (2000). Double Trouble: Bill Clinton and Elvis Presley in a Land of No Alternative. Picador. .
 
 
 Nash, Alanna (2010). Baby, Let's Play House: Elvis Presley and the Women Who Loved Him. It Books. .
 Roy, Samuel (1985). Elvis: Prophet of Power. Branden, .
 
 
 
 Red West, Sonny West, and Dave Hebler as told to Steve Dunleavy (1977). Elvis: What Happened? Bantam Books. .

External links 

 Elvis Presley at Curlie
 
 
 
 Elvis The Music official record label site
 Elvis Presley Interviews on officially sanctioned Elvis Australia site
 "The All American Boy: Enter Elvis and the Rock-a-billies" episode of 1968 Pop Chronicles radio series

 
1935 births
1950s in American music
1977 deaths
20th-century American male actors
20th-century American singers
20th-century Christians
Accidental deaths in Tennessee
Activists for African-American civil rights
Activists from Mississippi
Activists from Tennessee
American baritones
American blues singers
American car collectors
American country singers
American gospel singers
American Kenpo practitioners
American male film actors
American male karateka
American male singers
American people of Cherokee descent
American people of French descent
American people of German descent
American people of Norman descent
American people of Scotch-Irish descent
American people who self-identify as being of Native American descent
American performers of Christian music
American philanthropists
American rhythm and blues singers
American rock singers
American rockabilly musicians
American twins
Ballad musicians
Blues musicians from Mississippi
Blues musicians from Tennessee
Burials in Tennessee
Country Music Hall of Fame inductees
Country musicians from Mississippi
Country musicians from Tennessee
Deaths from cardiomyopathy
Grammy Lifetime Achievement Award winners
Humes High School alumni
Las Vegas shows
Male actors from Memphis, Tennessee
Male actors from Mississippi
Male actors from Tennessee
Male Western (genre) film actors
Military personnel from Mississippi
Military personnel from Tennessee
Military personnel of the Cold War
Mississippi Blues Trail
Musicians from Las Vegas
Musicians from Palm Springs, California
Obscenity controversies in music
Paramount Pictures contract players
Pentecostals from Mississippi
Pentecostals from Tennessee
People associated with firearms
People from Bad Nauheim
People from Tupelo, Mississippi
Presidential Medal of Freedom recipients
Presley family
Priscilla Presley
RCA Victor artists
Rock and roll musicians
Singers from Memphis, Tennessee
Singers from Mississippi
Southern gospel performers
Sun Records artists
Tank personnel
Traditional pop music singers
Twin musicians
United States Army non-commissioned officers
World record holders
Westgate Las Vegas